= Mercian Trail =

Group of museums and historical sites in the West Midlands

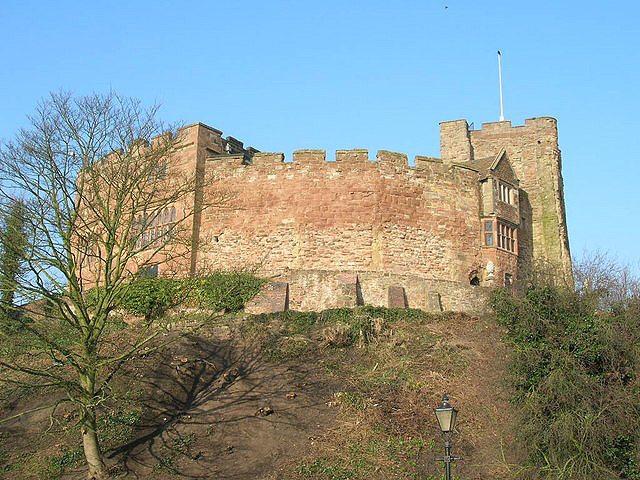
Tamworth Castle

The Mercian Trail is the name given to a group of museums and historical sites in the West Midlands of England that will be used to display objects from the Staffordshire Hoard. The trail is organised by a partnership of Lichfield District Council, Tamworth Borough Council, Staffordshire County Council, Stoke-on-Trent City Council and Birmingham City Council, and features the following locations:

- Birmingham Museum & Art Gallery (52.4802°N 1.9036°W)
- Potteries Museum & Art Gallery (53.0229°N 2.1781°W)
- Lichfield Cathedral (52.6855°N 1.8305°W)
- Tamworth Castle (52.6327°N 1.6968°W)

Most of the objects from the Staffordshire Hoard will be put on display at these four locations, although other locations may be included in the trail in the future. In addition a touring exhibition will take some objects from the hoard to other parts of the West Midlands, starting with the Shire Hall Gallery in Stafford. This exhibition will tie in with a display in the nearby Ancient High House Museum, entitled: 'Out of the Dark Ages: Stafford's Anglo-Saxon Origins'. The Ancient High House exhibition, which runs from 28 June to 1 October, examines the coming of the Anglo-Saxons and the emergence of the Kingdom of Mercia as well as telling the story of the Saxon burh founded in 913. The display cabinets include a selection of coins and artefacts including a wealth of domestic and personal items, these in contrast to the largely martial artefacts of the Hoard.

== Background ==
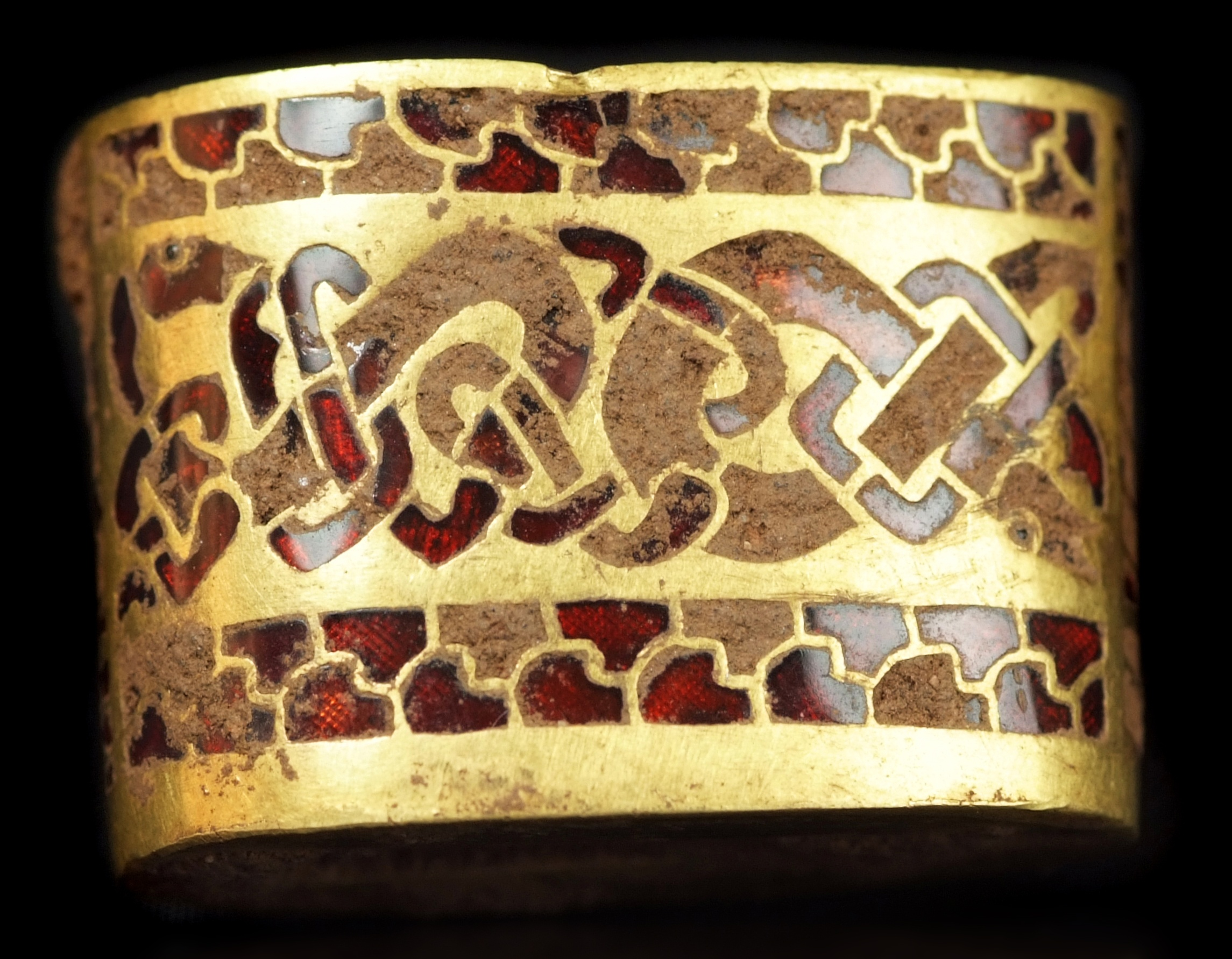
A sword hilt fitting from the Staffordshire Hoard Gold with cloisonné garnet inlay

The Staffordshire Hoard was discovered in a field in Hammerwich, near Lichfield in July 2009. After the hoard was declared treasure in September 2009, it was valued at £3.285 million, and a public appeal was launched to raise the money in order for Birmingham Museum & Art Gallery and the Potteries Museum & Art Gallery to jointly purchase the hoard. On 23 March 2010 it was announced that the required sum had been raised, and that the hoard would be purchased by these two museums for display in the West Midlands.

== Purpose ==
The Mercian Trail is not only intended to make the Staffordshire Hoard available for display to the public, but it is also intended to highlight the history and archaeology of the Anglo-Saxon kingdom of Mercia, which was centred on the area corresponding to the modern county of Staffordshire. The exhibits of the treasure will attempt to relate the items to other archaeological objects, and promote a greater understanding of the items in their historical context. The organisers of the trail have stated that the trail will attempt to provide answers to the following questions.

- How were such ornate items made in Anglo-Saxon times?
- What trading links were established in Anglo-Saxon times?
- How did the gold reach Britain's shores, and how was it carried here?
- What links are there to Birmingham's thriving jewellery industry today?
- What role did Staffordshire play in ancient Mercia?
- What was life like in Staffordshire during Anglo-Saxon times?
- What links are there to existing Staffordshire Anglo-Saxon finds?
- Why did the Hoard end up in Staffordshire?
- What are the links between the Hoard and early Christendom?
- What does the biblical inscription tell us?
- What are the links to the Lichfield Angel and St Chad?
- What is the significance of the folded up cross and serpents?
- Are there any links to the St Chad Gospels?
- What are the links to Offa, and key figures of the period?
- What battles took place, and what role did the Hoard play?
- Who were the owners of the Hoard, and what wars did they fight in?
- What role did Tamworth play in ancient Mercia?
- How did the archaeologists extract the Hoard?
- Why did the Hoard get laid down in Staffordshire?
- How can archaeology uncover the secrets of the Hoard?

== See also ==
- Staffordshire Hoard
- Mercian Way
