= Lichfield Gospels =

8th-century illuminated gospel book

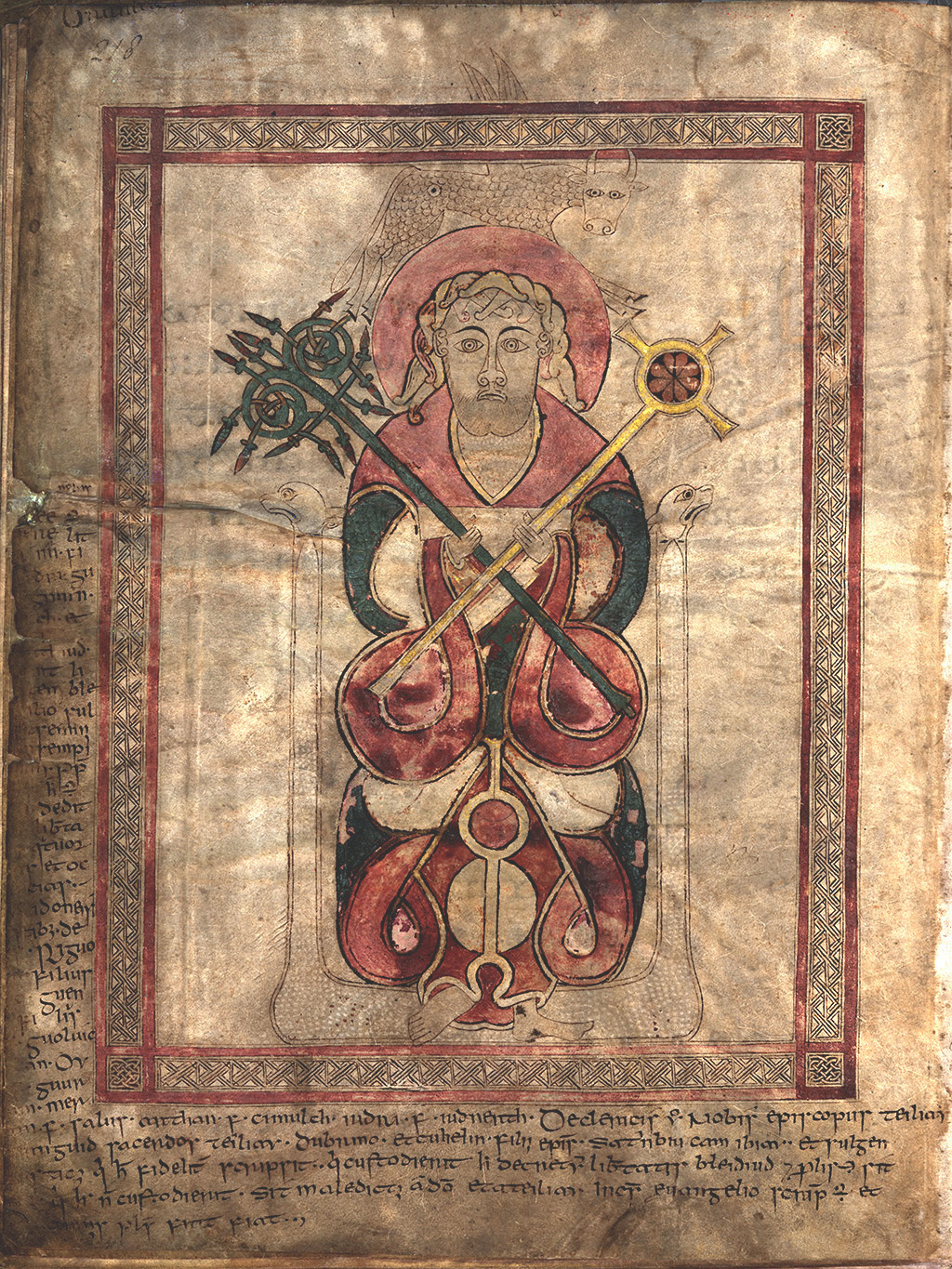
Evangelist portrait of Saint Luke

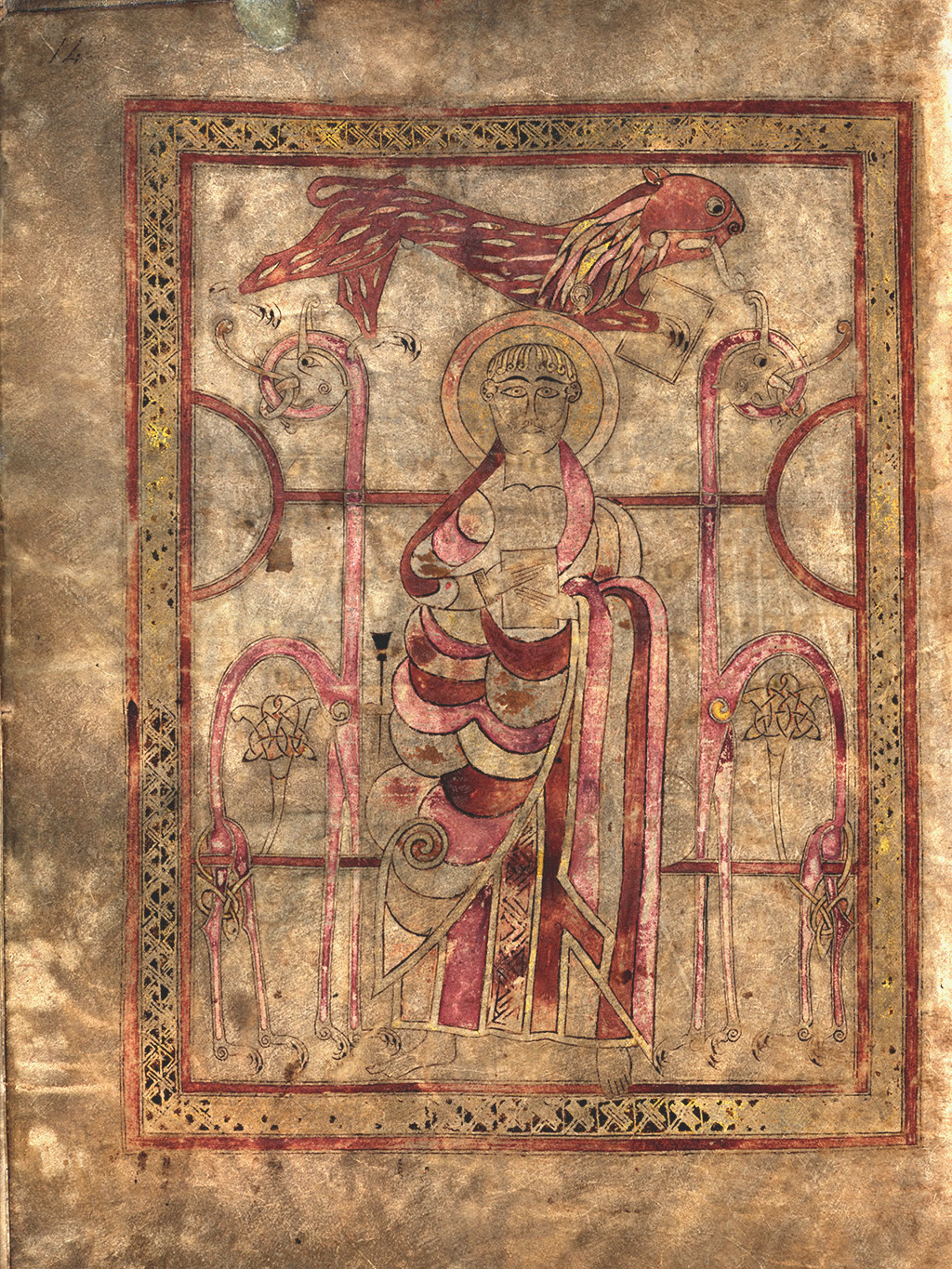
Evangelist portrait of Saint Mark

The Lichfield Gospels (also known as the St Chad Gospels, the Book of Chad, the Llandeilo Gospels, the St Teilo Gospels and variations of these) is an 8th-century Insular Gospel Book housed in Lichfield Cathedral. There are 236 surviving pages, eight of which are illuminated. Another four contain framed text. The pages measure 30.8 cm by 23.5 cm. The manuscript is also important because it includes, as marginalia, some of the earliest known examples of written Old Welsh, dating to the early part of the 8th century. The art historian Peter Lord dates the book at 730, placing it chronologically before the Book of Kells but after the Lindisfarne Gospels.

Marginal entries indicate that the manuscript was in the possession of the church of St Teilo in Wales at some point in the 9th century and eventually came into the possession of Lichfield Cathedral during the 10th century.

The manuscript was rebound in 1962 by Roger Powell; it was then discovered that the pages had been trimmed during the rebinding of 1707, and the manuscript had been cut into single leaves in the rebinding of 1862. In 2010, Bill Endres, then at the University of Kentucky, led efforts to digitise the manuscript.

In 2014, Endres returned to Lichfield Cathedral and used Reflectance Transformation Imaging (RTI) to capture the drypoint writing in the Lichfield Gospels. One drypoint entry on p. 226 shows the contributions of women during the early medieval period: its listing of three Anglo-Saxon female names suggests that women worked in the scriptorium at Lichfield.

== Provenance ==
Scholars view four places as possible sites for the making of the Lichfield Gospels: Ireland, Northumbria, Wales, and Lichfield. Paleographic and stylistic similarities link it to Northumbria and Iona: the painting techniques resemble those of the Lindisfarne Gospels and the Book of Kells. Some scholars interpret the Welsh marginalia as indicating that this great gospel book was likely written in Wales, perhaps at Llandeilo Fawr or other site in South Wales. However, in 1980, Wendy Stein made an extensive argument for Lichfield, viewing Wales as unlikely but Ireland and Northumbria as still possible. In 1996, by studying the type of paper, pigmentation, and style of text, researcher Pamela James concluded that the most likely place of origin for the manuscript was Lichfield itself. In 2003, the discovery of the Lichfield Angel, an Anglo-Saxon stone carving of an angel that had been buried in Lichfield Cathedral, provided further evidence for that conclusion. Sharp (2016) has drawn similarities to motifs in the Gospels with goldwork in the Staffordshire Hoard. But without definitive evidence, this debate is likely to continue.

Based upon style, the actual making of the book may be placed between 698 and 800. Patterns of interlaced birds on the cross-carpet page (p. 216) strikingly resemble the ornament on a cross shaft from Aberlady, Lothian, a Northumbrian site of the mid-8th century: the author/artist of the book and the sculptor of the cross-shaft ornament may have had a similar source for their designs. Although it is unknown how the book came to be in Lichfield, it was certainly there by the end of the 10th century. The opening folio contains a faded signature reading Wynsige presul, which probably refers to the Wynsige who was Bishop of Lichfield from about 963 to 972–5. Folio 4 contains a reference to Leofric, who was bishop from 1020 to 1026.

Wherever the book originated and however it came to Lichfield, it has been there since the 10th century. In 1646, during the English Civil War, Lichfield Cathedral was sacked and its library looted. The books and manuscripts were given to Frances, Duchess of Somerset, who returned them in 1672 or 1673. This is probably when the second volume of the Gospels was lost. Precentor William Higgins is credited with saving the remaining volume.

The book was put on public display in 1982. The bishops of Lichfield still swear allegiance to the Crown on the Lichfield Gospels.

Other Insular illuminated manuscripts of possible Welsh origin include the Ricemarch Psalter and the Hereford Gospels.

== Text and script ==
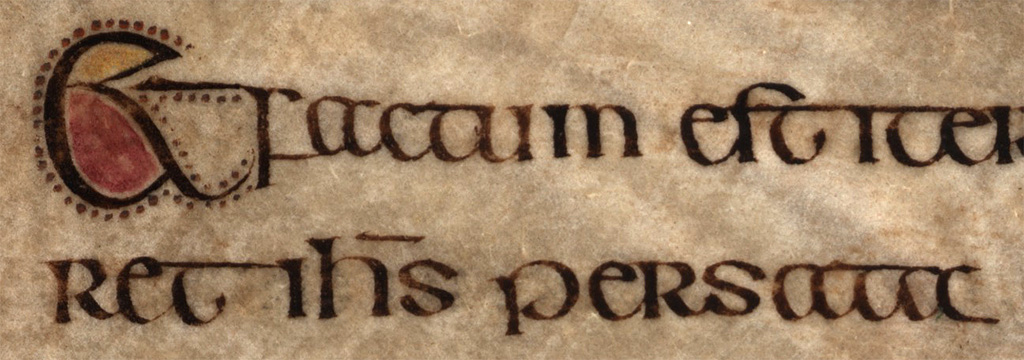
Script, Mark 2:23, p. 151

The extant manuscript contains the Gospels of Matthew and Mark, and the early part of the Gospel of Luke. The Latin text is written in a single column and is based on the Vulgate. The manuscript has almost 2000 variances from the Vulgate, almost a third of which it shares with the Hereford Gospels. There are fewer variations in the text that agree with the MacRegol Gospels and the Book of Armagh; 370 agree with the Book of Kells and 62 with the Lindisfarne Gospels.

The script is predominantly Insular majuscule but has some uncial characteristics and is thus called semi-uncial. The regularity of script suggests a single scribe; however, some evidence suggests that possibly four scribes copied the manuscript. The script forms strong links between the Lichfield manuscript and Northumbrian, Iona, and Irish manuscripts.

== Decoration ==
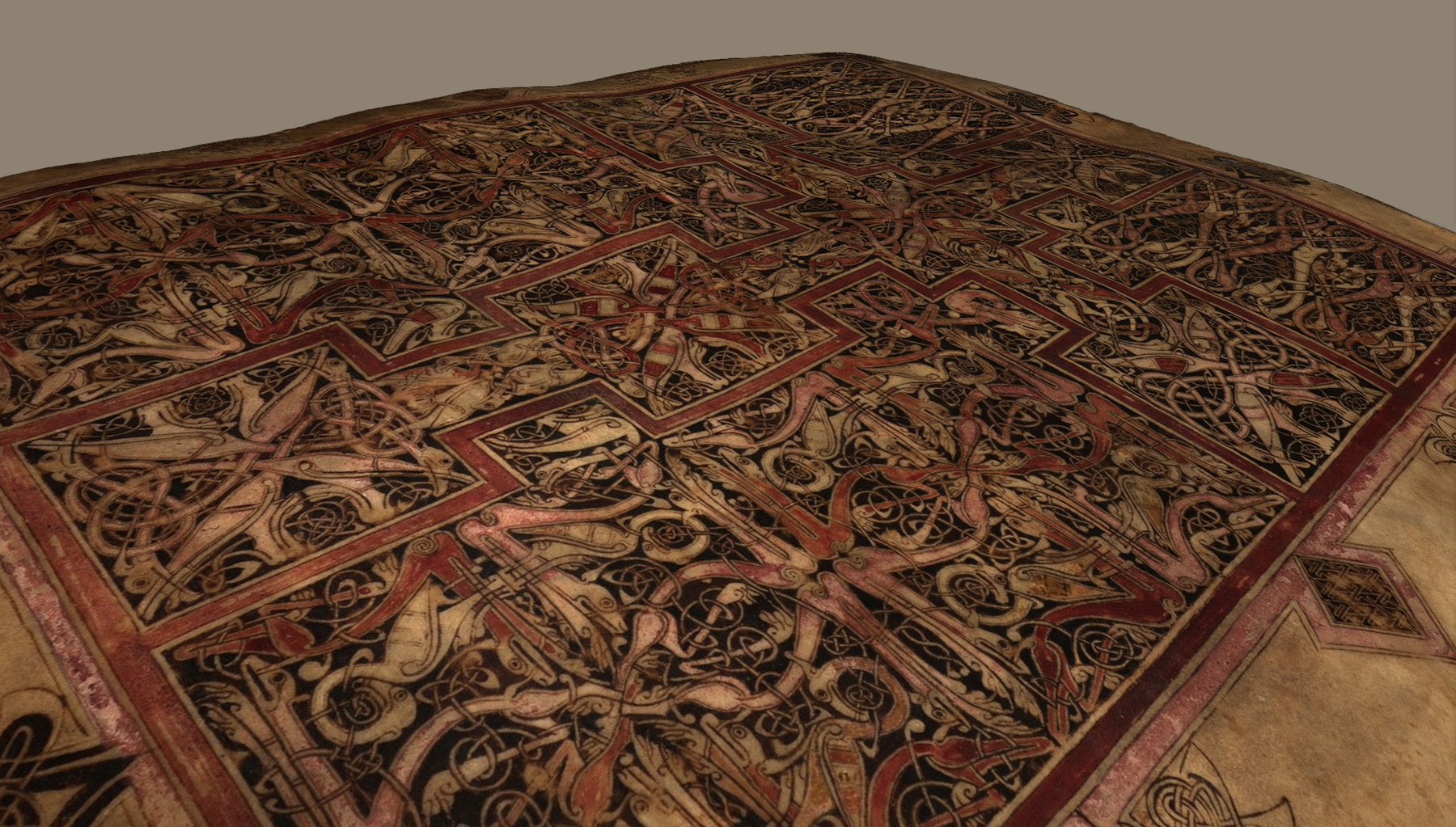
Cross carpet page

The manuscript has two evangelist portraits (St Mark and St Luke); a carpet page, which so closely resembles the working technique of Eadfrith that it should be attributed to him; incipit pages for Matthew (Lib of Liber), Mark (Ini of Initium), and Luke (Q of Quoniam); a Chi Rho monogram page, and a page with the four symbols of the evangelists. Unfortunately, Matthew's incipit page is severely worn, appearing to have functioned as the manuscript's front cover for a number of years. Matthew's gospel includes four framed pages: the Genealogy of Christ (3 pages) and Matthew's last page.

== Marginalia ==
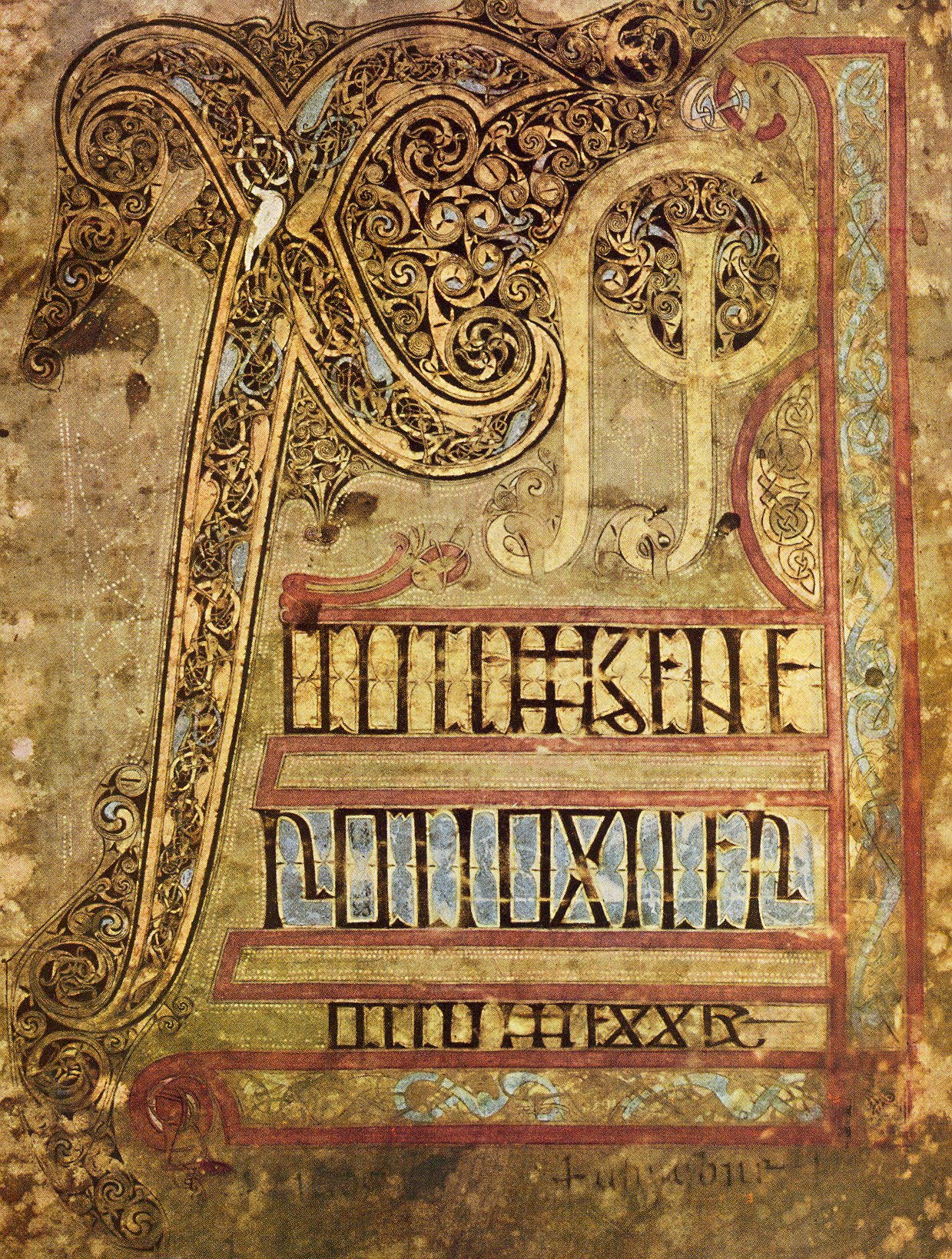
Chi-rho page

There are eight marginal inscriptions written in Latin and Old Welsh, which are some of the earliest extant written Welsh. The first records in Latin the gift of the manuscript "to God on the altar of St Teilo" by a man named Gelhi, who had bought the manuscript for the price of his best horse from Cingal. In her treatment of the Book of Kells, Françoise Henry reported Lichfield's provenance in similar terms: "The Book of Lichfield was exchanged for a horse in the late eighth century and given to the sanctuary of S. Tellio at Llandaff where it remained until the tenth century, when it was transferred to the Cathedral of Lichfield." The "altar of St Teilo" has in the past been associated with the monastery at Llandaff but, as it has been determined that the third, fourth and sixth marginal inscriptions refer to lands within fifteen miles of Llandeilo Fawr, it is now thought that the book spent time there. The second such inscription contains a unique example of early Welsh prose recording the details of the resolution of a land dispute. These two inscriptions have been dated to the mid-9th century. The marginalia were edited by John Gwenogvryn Evans with John Rhys in their 1893 edition of the Book of Llandaff.

Gifford Thomas-Edwards and Helen McKee have also identified nine dry-point glosses – glosses that are scratched into parchment without ink and so are only visible from an angle and hard to decipher. The first and final groups of three are decipherable as Anglo-Saxon personal names and it is likely that the others are as well. In order, they appear in the glosses as follows:

Page	Text
217	1. Wulfun; 2. Alchelm; 3. Eadric; (All of these are at the lower left of the page.)
221	1. Wulfun; 2. 7 + Berht/elf; (These are in the centre of the left-hand margin.); 3. [Pas]t [+icc] (This is in the bottom margin.)
226	1. Berhtfled; 2. Elfled; 3. Wulfild; (All of these are in the bottom margin.)

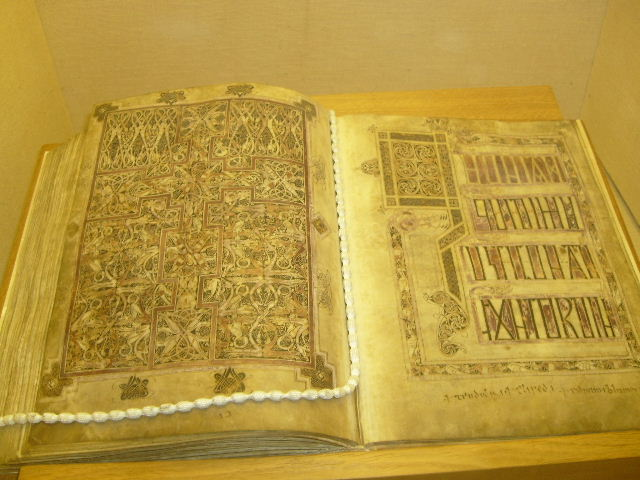
Cross-Carpet and Luke's Incipit

It is possible that there are other glosses on this text, and on other Insular gospel books, that are yet to be identified. The names themselves might be significant if they can be dated, as the provenance of the manuscript is uncertain. An 8th-century date would show that the gospel book was in Anglo-Saxon territory before arriving in Wales, whereas a date after the end of the 10th century (at Lichfield) would add little to what is already known – although a dating either way does little to rule out its having been produced in Ireland or Northumbria for a Welsh or Mercian ecclesiastic centre.

Furthermore, it is very difficult to discern whether the same hand wrote the text, the gospels and dry-point glosses unless the letters show signs of a later development in style. Dry-point glosses are etched into the vellum rather than produced by a smooth flow of a quill over a writing surface. G. Charles-Edwards and H. McKee believe they have identified such features, elements of the letters in the glosses that appear to be a late-9th-century invention, in response to Carolingian minuscule. Therefore, it is likely that these glosses were additions after the Gospels had been moved to Lichfield.
