= Wulfgar of Lichfield =

10th-century Bishop of Lichfield

Wulfgar
- Bishop of Lichfield
- Appointed: between 935 and 941
- Term ended: between 946 and 949
- Predecessor: Ælfwine
- Successor: Cynesige

Personal details
- Died: between 946 and 949

Wulfgar (died c. 947) was a medieval Bishop of Lichfield.

Wulfgar was consecrated between 935 and 941 and died between 946 and 949. He is known to history from William of Malmesbury, a number of royal charters, some land grants made by him and as witness in several assorted contractual documents from the 10th century.

== Citations ==
Christian titles
Preceded by Ælfwine	Bishop of Lichfield c. 937–c. 947	Succeeded by Cynesige
