= William Heyworth =

15th-century Bishop of Coventry and Lichfield

- Bishop of Coventry and Lichfield
- Appointed: 20 November 1419
- Term ended: between 15 March and 24 March 1447
- Predecessor: James Cary
- Successor: William Booth

Orders
- Consecration: by 28 July 1420

Personal details
- Died: March 1447
- Denomination: Catholic

William Heyworth (died 1447) was a medieval Bishop of Coventry and Lichfield.

Heyworth was nominated on 20 November 1419, and consecrated on 28 July 1420. He died between 15 March and 24 March 1447.

== Citations ==
Catholic Church titles
Preceded by John Catterick	Bishop of Coventry and Lichfield; 1419–1447	Succeeded by William Booth
