= Lichfield Angel =

Anglo-Saxon sculpture of Gabriel

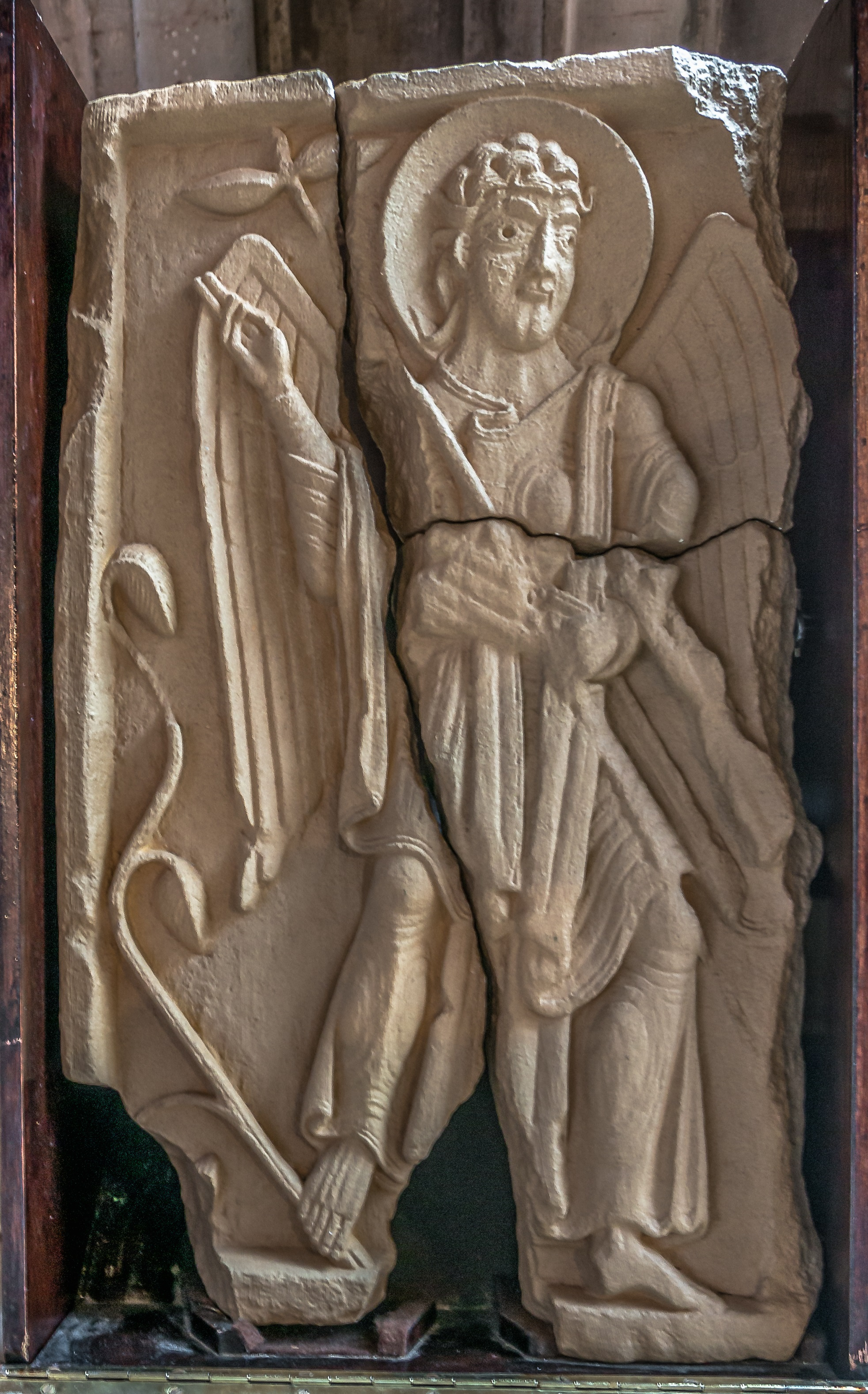
A reconstruction of the piece

The Lichfield Angel is a late 8th-century Anglo-Saxon stone carving discovered at Lichfield Cathedral in Staffordshire, England, in 2003. It depicts the archangel Gabriel, likely as the left-hand portion of a larger plaque showing the Annunciation, along with a lost right-hand panel of the Virgin Mary. The carving is thought to be the end piece of a shrine containing the remains of Saint Chad (died 672) to whom, with Mary, the cathedral is dedicated.

The Lichfield Angel was found buried in the nave of the cathedral during an archaeological survey of the area ahead of the construction of an altar platform. It was found broken into three pieces, two of which were placed face-down in the ground. The plaque was originally decorated with coloured pigments and the halo may have been gilded. The carving retains traces of the original pigments, which is rare for Anglo-Saxon painted stonework; the careful placement of the fragments in the ground has contributed to survival of the pigment.

The panels may have been broken and buried as a result of Viking raids on Mercia in the mid-9th century. They are now shown alongside the near contemporary Lichfield Gospels.

== Description ==
The Lichfield Angel is a limestone carving of the archangel Gabriel. It is a portion of a larger piece, since lost, and the three surviving fragments measure 635 by 370 millimetres (25.0 in × 14.6 in) at their widest extent when fitted together. The stone is around 100 millimetres (3.9 in) thick. The material is identified as Ancaster stone.

Gabriel, a winged angel with a halo, is depicted raising his right hand in benediction while his left holds a sceptre with sprouting foliage. Gabriel is depicted in the act of stepping down. His left foot is on the ground while his right is being lifted from a vine, possibly intended to symbolise paradise. Gabriel's eyes are deeply drilled recesses.

== Discovery and conservation ==
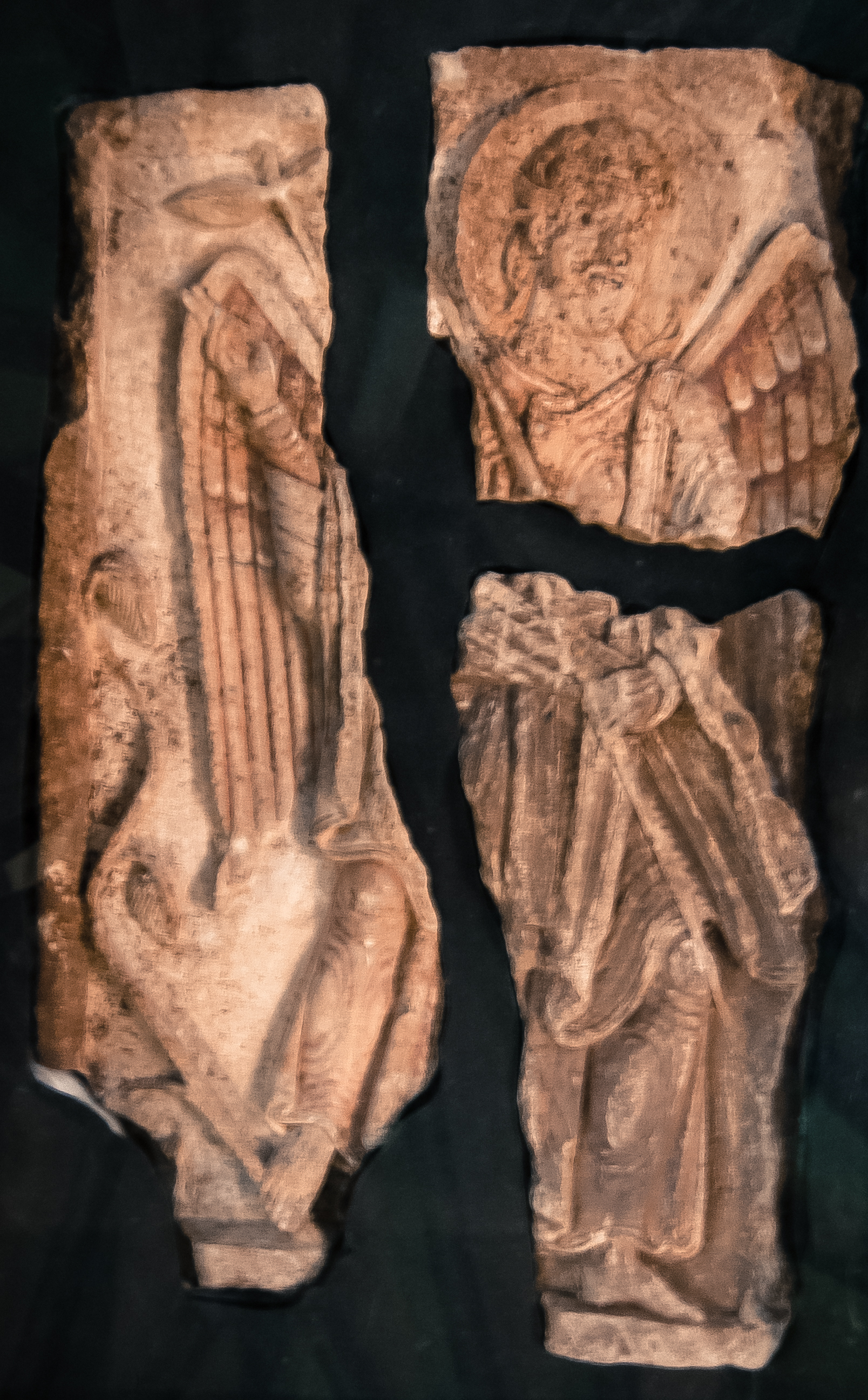
The separate fragments

The Lichfield Angel was discovered during excavations ahead of the 2003 construction of a retractable altar platform in the Lichfield Cathedral's nave. The excavations were led by cathedral archaeologist Warwick Rodwell. At this time little of the archaeology of the nave was known. They uncovered portions of the Anglo-Saxon cathedral as well as the north and south extents of the Norman-era nave and a number of buried artefacts. A sunken chamber was found to the east of the nave that, with evidence from the writings of Bede, was identified as the remains of a shrine to the 7th-century saint, Chad of Mercia.

The Lichfield Angel was recovered from the inside of a burned structure within a larger stone-built Anglo-Saxon building. It had been broken into three pieces, the main two of which were found placed facedown on the rubble as a mark of respect. This helped to preserve the original pigments, which are unusually bright for a stone sculpture. The third fragment, of the angel's left leg, was found face up and was more badly worn than the other pieces, retaining less of the pigment. A silver penny of King Edgar (r. 959–975) was found in context with the carving, suggesting that it was buried before the end of the 10th century. After the excavation was completed, the area was refilled and the nave platform constructed.

Rodwell convened a meeting of experts in 2004 at the Society of Antiquaries of London to discuss the angel's treatment, which was attended by representatives from the British Museum, Victoria & Albert Museum and the Courtauld Gallery and led to the commissioning of a detailed examination of the piece ahead of its conservation and display. The initial works were funded by the Pilgrim Trust. Three-dimensional laser scans were made of the fragments by the Birmingham Museums and Gallery Collection Centre, allowing them to be reassembled digitally while avoiding potential wear and tear caused by trial and error fitting-together of the physical pieces. Some cleaning was carried out but remnants of soil adhered strongly to the surface of the carving, making it risky to clean fully without damaging the surviving pigment layer.

The Lichfield Angel was first displayed at the cathedral in February 2006. The fragments were removed for study and conservation efforts in March 2006, and returned to the cathedral for display in June 2007. They are, as of 2009, shown in a reassembled condition alongside the Anglo-Saxon Lichfield Gospels.

== Archaeological assessment ==
=== Origin ===
The surviving fragments of the Lichfield Angel are thought to be the left-hand portion of a house-shaped end piece to an enclosure around the coffin of the shrine to St Chad. Gabriel is identified through his pose and gesture. The full sculpture is thought to have depicted the Annunciation by Gabriel to the Virgin Mary that she would bear Christ. Lichfield Cathedral is jointly dedicated to St Chad and to Mary. The portion of the panel depicting Mary may still lie buried under the cathedral floor.

The carving was made in Mercia specifically for the cathedral. The style of carving suggests that the sculptor was influenced by 6th-century Eastern Mediterranean works. It was made towards the end of the 8th century, around the end of the reign of Offa of Mercia at a time when Lichfield served as a third archbishopric in England. The cult of St Chad, the fifth bishop of Mercia and the first to sit in Lichfield, was heavily promoted in early 9th-century Mercia and the construction of the shrine and carving of the angel may be linked to the cult.

=== Decoration ===
Analysis of the remains of the pigments indicates that Gabriel's robes were originally painted with a mixture of red and yellow, with white pigments highlighting the folds. This would have given a colouration similar to red gold, one of the most valued forms of precious metal in the Anglo-Saxon period. The artist would have layered and mixed paints to produce a range of colours, both as highlights and shading. Gabriel's wings were coloured in shades of red in the shadow, pink in the main (with yellow being mixed in) and white highlights. Gabriel's hair is blonde and the inner portion of the halo was a darker yellow. Gabriel's hands, feet and face were painted in a flesh tone, with the inside of the lips and nostrils accentuated in black. The background was white with a red border; the stem of the vine was coloured red and the buds yellow. The colours are similar to those seen in the near-contemporary Lichfield Gospels and may reflect an attempt at "Mercian branding". The red and yellow pigments were derived from iron oxides, the white from calcium carbonate and lead, and the black from carbon.

The outer part of the halo was coated with a mordant layer formed of an egg-bound mix of silicaceous, iron-containing and aluminium minerals. Its smooth finish may have been to allow the application of a layer of gilding and would have permitted the gold to be burnished. No gilding survives on the Angel but a small sample was found nearby during excavation. The recesses in the eyes may have been to permit the mounting of precious stones, though no remnants of adhesive were found within so they may have been left empty.

=== Burial and legacy ===
The carving bears a mark from a hammer and chisel to the right of the angel, evidence of its intentional destruction rather than accidental damage. This is thought to have been inflicted at some point between the onset of Viking raids on Mercia in the mid-9th century (during which the Lichfield Cathedral was captured) and the restoration of the cathedral in the early 10th century. Many of the cathedral treasures are known to have been evacuated to Wales in the mid-9th century.

The Lichfield Angel is a rare survival of painted stone Anglo-Saxon sculpture. Archaeologist Rosemary Cramp and art historian Jane Hawkes have described the Lichfield Angel as "a remarkable survival – of European importance when considered in the context of Early Medieval sculpture". They state the carving is of excellent quality and the sculpture has been well preserved by its careful burial, escaping weathering.
