= Hemele =

8th-century Bishop of Lichfield

- Bishop of Lichfield
- Appointed: before 757
- Term ended: 765
- Predecessor: Witta
- Successor: Cuthfrith

Orders
- Consecration: before 757

Personal details
- Died: 765

Hemele (or Hemel) was a medieval Bishop of Lichfield. He was consecrated before 757 and died in 765.

== Citations ==
Christian titles
Preceded by Witta	Bishop of Lichfield c. 757–765	Succeeded by Cuthfrith
