= John Burghill =

14th and 15th-century Bishop of Coventry and Lichfield and Bishop of Llandaff

- Bishop of Coventry and Lichfield
- Appointed: 2 July 1398
- Term ended: about 27 May 1414
- Predecessor: Richard le Scrope
- Successor: John Catterick
- Previous post: Bishop of Llandaff

Orders
- Consecration: c. 10 July 1396

Personal details
- Died: c. 27 May 1414
- Denomination: Catholic

John Burghill (died 1414) was a medieval Bishop of Llandaff and Bishop of Coventry and Lichfield.

Burghill was nominated to Llandaff on 12 April 1396, and consecrated around 10 July 1396. He was translated to Coventry and Lichfield on 2 July 1398.

Burghill died as Bishop of Coventry and Lichfield about 27 May 1414.

== Citations ==
Catholic Church titles
Preceded by Andrew Barret	Bishop of Llandaff; 1396–1398	Succeeded by Thomas Peverel
Preceded by Richard le Scrope	Bishop of Coventry and Lichfield; 1398–1414	Succeeded by John Catterick
