= Godwin (bishop) =

11th-century Bishop of Lichfield

- Bishop of Lichfield
- Appointed: between 1002 and 1004
- Term ended: after 1017
- Predecessor: Elphege
- Successor: Leofgar

Orders
- Consecration: between 1002 and 1004

Personal details
- Died: after 1017

Godwin (or Godwine; died after 1017) was a medieval Bishop of Lichfield.

Godwin was consecrated between 1002 and 1004 and died after 1017.

== Citations ==
Christian titles
Preceded by Elphege	Bishop of Lichfield c 1003–c. 1017	Succeeded by Leofgar
