= Mercian Way =

Long distance cycle route in England

National Cycle Route 5
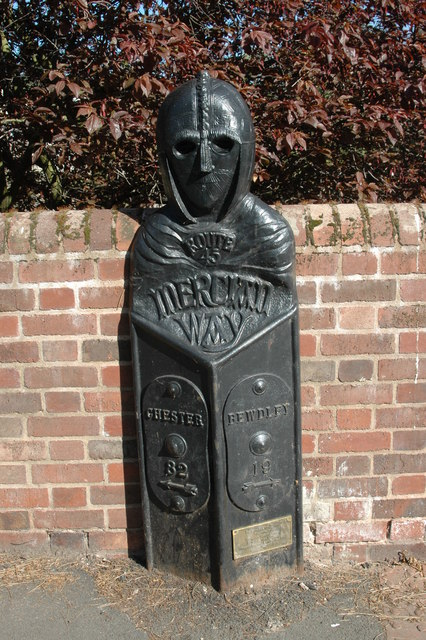
- One of the waymarkers
- Location: United Kingdom
- Designation: UK National Cycle Network
- Trailheads: Salisbury (south) to Chester (north)
- Use: Cycling
- Surface: Varies from on-road to traffic-free tarmac to compacted surface

The Mercian Way is a 230 miles (370 km) long cycle path that runs from Salisbury in Wiltshire to Chester in Cheshire. Operated by Sustrans, it is part of National Cycle Route 45, but is also well used by walkers. The path is so named because it passes through what was once the ancient Anglo-Saxon Kingdom of Mercia. To reflect its name a number of waymarkers depicting Saxon warriors were commissioned and have been placed along the route.

== See also ==
- Mercian Trail
