= Brihtmær =

11th-century Bishop of Lichfield

- Bishop of Lichfield
- Appointed: before 1026
- Term ended: 1039
- Predecessor: Leofgar
- Successor: Wulfsige

Orders
- Consecration: before 1026

Personal details
- Died: 1039

Brihtmær (Note: Or Brihtmar or Beorhtmaer or Brithmar) (died 1039) was a medieval Bishop of Lichfield.

Brihtmær was consecrated sometime before about 1026 and died in 1039. He was appointed by Cnut the Great, king of England, and nothing is known of why he was chosen or of his background.

== Citations ==
Christian titles
Preceded by Leofgar	Bishop of Lichfield c. 1023–1039	Succeeded by Wulfsige
