= Roger de Meyland =

13th-century Bishop of Coventry and Lichfield

- Bishop of Coventry and Lichfield
- Elected: January 1257
- Term ended: 16 December 1295
- Predecessor: Roger Weseham
- Successor: Walter Langton
- Other post: papal chaplain

Orders
- Consecration: 10 March 1258

Personal details
- Died: 16 December 1295
- Denomination: Catholic

Roger de Meyland (Note: Or Roger de Longespée, Roger de Meuland, Roger Longespee or Roger de Molend) (died 1295) was a medieval Bishop of Coventry and Lichfield, England.

Roger was a cousin of King Henry III of England, although the exact relationship is unclear. Roger was born c. 1215, and may have been a son of William de Longespee, uncle of Henry III. Little is known of his early career, and he first appears in 1257 as a canon of Lichfield and a papal chaplain. He was elected in January 1257, and consecrated on 10 March 1258. His election was probably due to the influence of Richard of Cornwall, King Henry's brother, whom Roger later accompanied to Germany, where Richard had been elected king.

Roger was High Sheriff of Berkshire in 1271.

Roger died on 16 December 1295.

== Citations ==
Political offices
Preceded by William de L'Isle	Sheriff of Berkshire and Oxfordshire; 1271–1273	Succeeded by Gilbert de Kirkby
Catholic Church titles
Preceded by Roger Weseham	Bishop of Coventry and Lichfield; 1257–1295	Succeeded by Walter Langton
