= Leofgar =

11th-century Bishop of Lichfield

- Bishop of Lichfield
- Appointed: after 1017
- Term ended: c. 1026
- Predecessor: Godwin
- Successor: Brihtmær

Orders
- Consecration: after 1017

Personal details
- Died: c. 1026

Leofgar (or Leosgar; died c. 1026) was a medieval Bishop of Lichfield.

Leofgar was consecrated after 1017 and died sometime before about 1026. He was appointed by Cnut, the king of England, and nothing is known of why he was chosen or of his background.

== Citations ==
Christian titles
Preceded by Godwin	Bishop of Lichfield c. 1017–c. 1026	Succeeded by Brihtmær
