= Wulfsige (bishop of Lichfield) =

11th-century Bishop of Lichfield

- Bishop of Lichfield
- Appointed: 1039
- Term ended: 1053
- Predecessor: Brihtmær
- Successor: Leofwin

Orders
- Consecration: 1039

Personal details
- Died: 1053

Wulfsige (or Wulsy; died 1053) was a medieval Bishop of Lichfield.

Wulfsige was consecrated in 1039 and died in 1053. Little else is known about him or his background.

== Citations ==
Christian titles
Preceded by Brihtmær	Bishop of Lichfield; 1039–1053	Succeeded by Leofwin
