= Elphege of Lichfield =

10th-century Bishop of Lichfield

Elphege
- Bishop of Lichfield
- Appointed: 975
- Term ended: between 1002 and 1004
- Predecessor: Wynsige
- Successor: Godwin

Orders
- Consecration: 975

Personal details
- Died: between 1002 and 1004

Elphege (or Ælfheah; died c. 1003) was a medieval Bishop of Lichfield.

Elphege was consecrated in 975 and died between 1002 and 1004.

== Citations ==
Christian titles
Preceded by Wynsige	Bishop of Lichfield; 975–c. 1003	Succeeded by Godwin
