= Peter of Lichfield =

11th-century Bishop of Lichfield and Bishop of Chester

Peter
- Bishop of Chester
- Province: Canterbury
- Appointed: 1072
- Term ended: 1085
- Successor: Robert de Limesey
- Other post: possibly a royal clerk
- Previous post: Bishop of Lichfield

Orders
- Consecration: after May 1072

Personal details
- Died: 1085
- Buried: Chester
- Denomination: Roman Catholic Church

Peter (died 1085) was a medieval cleric. He became Bishop of Lichfield in 1072, then his title changed to Bishop of Chester when the see was moved in 1075.

Peter had been a royal chaplain before being nominated to the see of Lichfield. Nothing else is known of his background, although presumably he was a Norman, as were most of King William I of England's episcopal appointments. He may have been a royal clerk of King Edward the Confessor, although one charter of 1065 that lists his name is a forgery. He was the custodian of the see of Lincoln, before his elevation to the episcopate. He was consecrated after May 1072 and died in 1085. Peter pillaged the abbey of Coventry, "forcing an entry into their dormitory and breaking into their strongboxes, robbing them of their horses and all their goods" and was censured by Archbishop Lanfranc of Canterbury, who chastised him that "it is neither your role or as a bishop nor within your power to do these things". Peter was buried at Chester. The historian Katharine Keats-Rohan suggests that he was the uncle of Regenbald, a royal clerk under King Edward and King William.

== Citations ==
Catholic Church titles
Preceded by Leofwin	Bishop of Lichfield; 1072–1075	See moved to Chester
New title	Bishop of Chester; 1075–1085	Succeeded by Robert de Limesey
