= Leofwin =

11th-century Bishop of Lichfield

- Bishop of Lichfield
- Appointed: 1053
- Term ended: resigned 1070
- Predecessor: Wulfsige
- Successor: Peter
- Other post: Abbot of Coventry

Orders
- Consecration: 1053

Personal details
- Died: after 1071

Leofwin (or Leofwine; died after 1071) was a medieval Bishop of Lichfield.

Appointed to the see by King Edward the Confessor of England, Leofwin was a monk before becoming a bishop. For a time, he was abbot of the abbey of Coventry as well as bishop, but he was no longer abbot at the time of the Norman Conquest of England. He may have owed his promotion to Lichfield to Leofric, Earl of Mercia and Leofric's family. He was consecrated in 1053, but he went overseas to be consecrated because of the irregular election of Archbishop Stigand of Canterbury. Around 1068, he was the recipient of a writ from King William I of England, which shows that he had accommodated himself to the Conquest. According to the Handbook of British Chronology, he died in 1067, but he continues to appear in documentary evidence, and most historians, such as Frank Barlow, believe that he was deprived of his see in 1070 and died sometime after that. He was a married bishop, and it appears that he was aware that he was unlikely to be allowed to retain his bishopric because of his marital status. He refused to appear at the council held in London on 7 April 1070, despite being summoned to answer charges for his marriage. He was condemned as contumacious in his absence, and a year later he officially resigned his see and retired to Coventry Abbey. The new Archbishop of Canterbury, Lanfranc, had already denounced Leofwin's marriage. Leofwin was a nephew of Leofric, Earl of Mercia. The see of Lichfield remained vacant until 1072, when a successor was appointed.

== Citations ==
Catholic Church titles
| Preceded by Wulfsige | Bishop of Lichfield; 1053–1070 | Succeeded by Peter |
