= Witta (bishop of Lichfield) =

8th-century Bishop of Lichfield

- Bishop of Lichfield
- Appointed: 737
- Term ended: between 749 and 757
- Predecessor: Aldwine
- Successor: Hemele

Orders
- Consecration: 737

Personal details
- Died: between 749 and 757

Witta (Note: Or Hwita or Huitta) was a medieval Bishop of Lichfield. He was consecrated in 737 and died between 749 and 757.

== Citations ==
Christian titles
Preceded by Aldwine	Bishop of Lichfield; 737–c. 753	Succeeded by Hemele
