= Cuthfrith =

8th-century Bishop of Lichfield

- Bishop of Lichfield
- Appointed: 765
- Term ended: c. 769
- Predecessor: Hemele
- Successor: Berhthun

Orders
- Consecration: 765

Personal details
- Died: c. 769

Cuthfrith (Note: Or Cuthfrid or Cuthred) (died c. 769) was a medieval Bishop of Lichfield.

Cuthfrith was consecrated in 765 and died about 769.

== Citations ==
Christian titles
Preceded by Hemele	Bishop of Lichfield; 765–c. 769	Succeeded by Berhthun
