= John Catterick =

15th-century English bishop

- Bishop of Exeter
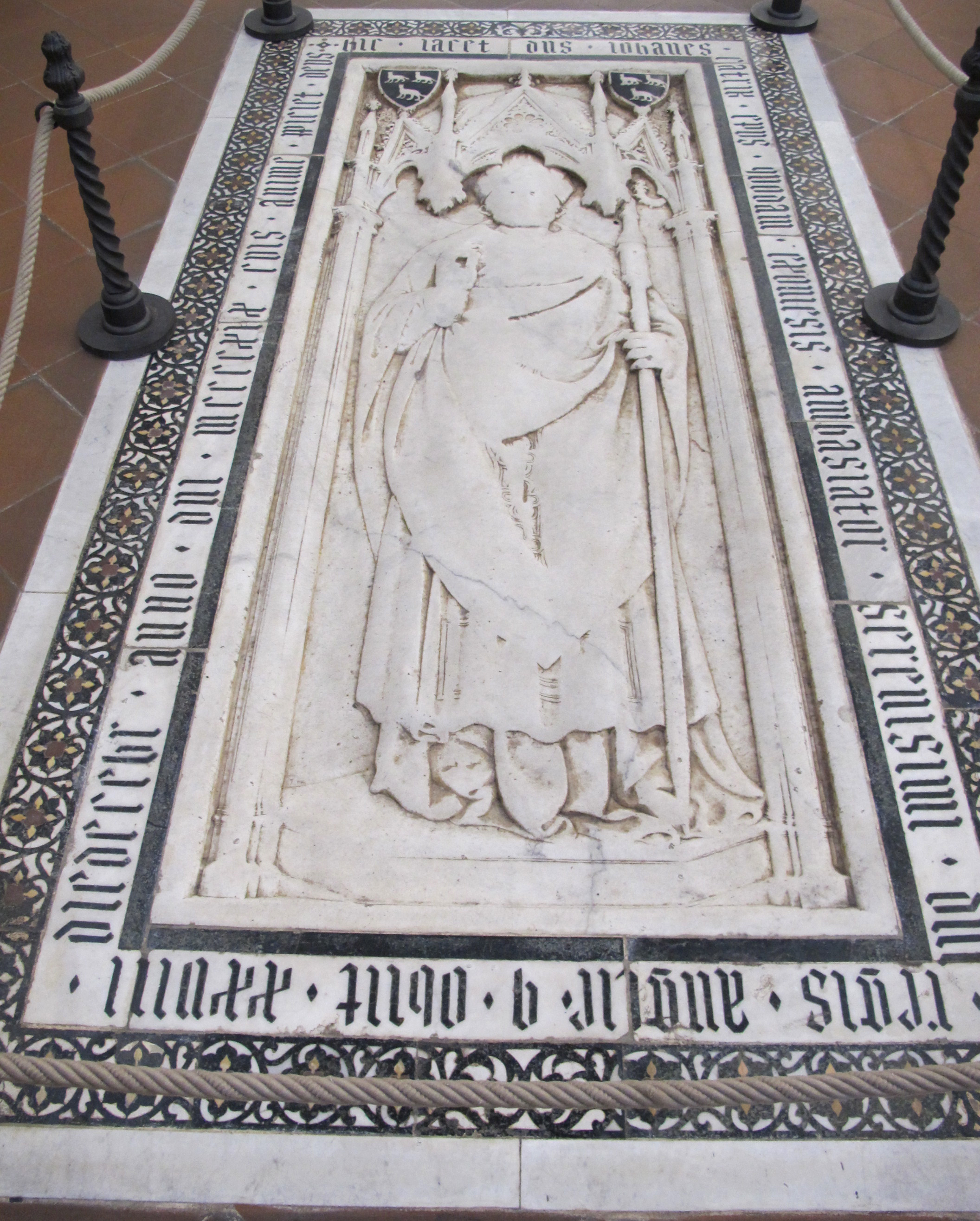
- Appointed: 20 November 1419
- Term ended: 28 December 1419
- Predecessor: Edmund Stafford
- Successor: Edmund Lacey
- Previous posts: Bishop of St David's; Bishop of Coventry and Lichfield

Personal details
- Died: 28 December 1419
- Denomination: Catholic

John Catterick (Note: Or Ketterick or Keterich) (died 1419) was a medieval Bishop of St David's, Bishop of Coventry and Lichfield, and Bishop of Exeter.

Catterick was consecrated Bishop of St David's in the early part of 1414, and translated to the Diocese of Coventry and Lichfield on 1 February 1415. On 20 November 1419 he was elected Bishop of Exeter in succession to Edmund Stafford: however, he was in Rome at the time, and was never formally installed, as he died barely a month later on 28 December 1419.

Catterick was buried in the Basilica di Santa Croce in Florence, where his grave is marked by a relief tomb slab.

== Citations ==
Catholic Church titles
Preceded by Henry Chichele	Bishop of St David's; 1414–1415	Succeeded by Stephen Patrington
Preceded by John Burghill	Bishop of Coventry and Lichfield; 1415–1419	Succeeded by William Heyworth
Preceded by Edmund Stafford	Bishop of Exeter; 1419	Succeeded by Edmund Lacey
