= Lichfield Cathedral =

Cathedral in Staffordshire, England

- Cathedral Church of Saint Mary and Saint Chad
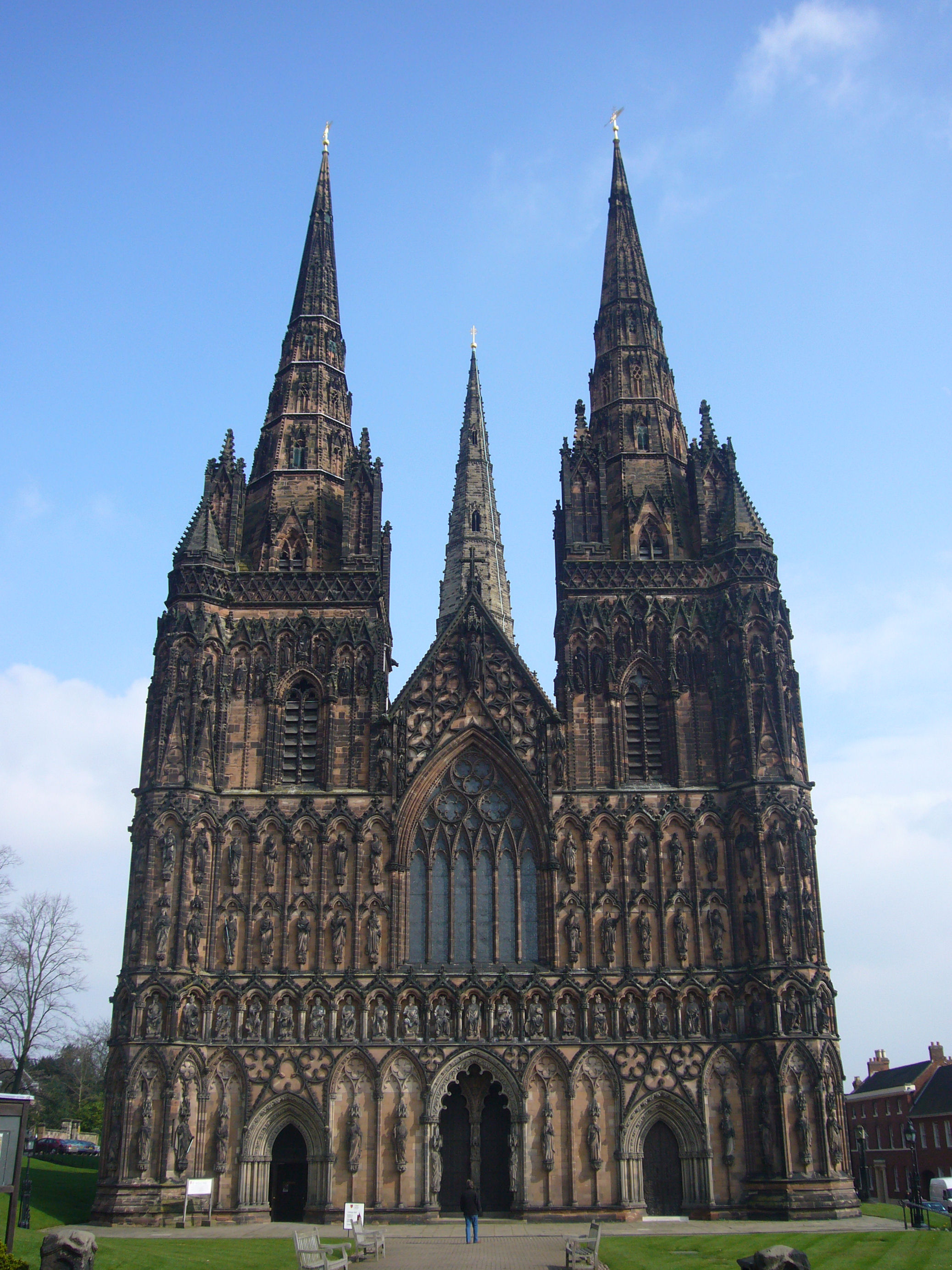
- The West Front of Lichfield Cathedral

- Shown within Staffordshire
- 52°41′08″N 1°49′50″W
- OS grid reference: SK 11563 09770
- Location: Lichfield, Staffordshire
- Country: England
- Denomination: Church of England
- Previous denomination: Roman Catholic
- Tradition: High church
- Website: lichfield-cathedral.org

Architecture
- Functional status: Cathedral
- Previous cathedrals: Early Anglo-Saxon and a second cathedral of undetermined date
- Style: Gothic
- Years built: early 13th century–1330

Specifications
- Length: 113 m (371 ft)
- Height: 76.8 m (252 ft) (central spire)

Administration
- Province: Canterbury
- Diocese: Lichfield

Clergy
- Bishop: Michael Ipgrave
- Dean: Jan McFarlane (Dean)

Lichfield Cathedral, formally the Cathedral Church of Saint Mary and Saint Chad in Lichfield, is a Church of England cathedral in the city of Lichfield, England. It is the seat of the bishop of Lichfield and the principal church of the diocese of Lichfield and holds daily services. The cathedral has been designated a Grade I listed building.

The diocese of Mercia was created in 656, and a cathedral was consecrated on the present site in 700. The relics of the fifth bishop, Chad of Mercia, were housed at the cathedral until being removed in 1538 during the English Reformation. In 1075 the seat of the diocese was moved to St John the Baptist's Church, Chester and then from there to St Mary's Priory in Coventry. Lichfield gained co-cathedral status in 1148, and became the sole cathedral in the diocese after St Mary's Priory was dissolved in 1539 and the new diocese of Chester created in 1541. During the English Civil War the Cathedral Close, Lichfield was besieged three times; the church was severely damaged, losing all of its medieval glass and many monuments.

The cathedral was built between early 13th century and c. 1320 in the Decorated Gothic style. The work probably began with the choir at the east end and progressed west through the transepts, chapter house, nave, and south-west tower. The lady chapel, central tower, south-east tower, and three spires followed. The building was restored after the Civil War under bishop John Hacket and several times in the 18th and 19th centuries. Many of the details of the building date from the restorations undertaken by George Gilbert Scott, owing to the soft sandstone of which it is constructed as well as war damage.

== Overview ==
The cathedral is dedicated to St Chad and St Mary. Its internal length is 113 m (371 ft), and the breadth of the nave is 21 m (69 ft). The central spire is 77 m (253 ft) high and the western spires are about 58 m (190 ft) with the southern spire a little taller than the northern one. The stone is Mercian red sandstone and came from quarries close to Lichfield. The walls of the nave lean outwards slightly, due to the weight of stone used in the ceiling vaulting; some 200–300 tons of which was removed during renovation work in 1788 to prevent the walls leaning further.

Lichfield suffered severe damage during the English Civil War, in which all of the stained glass was destroyed. In spite of this the windows of the Lady Chapel contain some of the finest medieval Flemish painted glass in existence. Dating from the 1530s, it came from Herkenrode Abbey near Hasselt, Belgium, in 1803. It had been purchased by Sir Brooke Boothby, 6th Baronet after the abbey was dissolved by Revolutionary France in 1795. The Herkenrode glass was rededicated in 2015 after a five-year renovation. There are also some fine windows by Betton and Evans (1819), and many fine late 19th-century windows, particularly those by Charles Eamer Kempe.

The Lichfield Gospels, also known as the St Chad's Gospels, dated 720–740, are the gospels of Matthew and Mark, and the early part of Luke, written in Latin with some marginalia in Old Welsh. It has similarities to the Lindisfarne Gospels. The manuscript is on display in the Chapter House.

The Cathedral Close is one of the most complete in the country and includes a medieval courtyard which once housed the men of the choir. The three spires are often referred to as the "Ladies of the Vale".

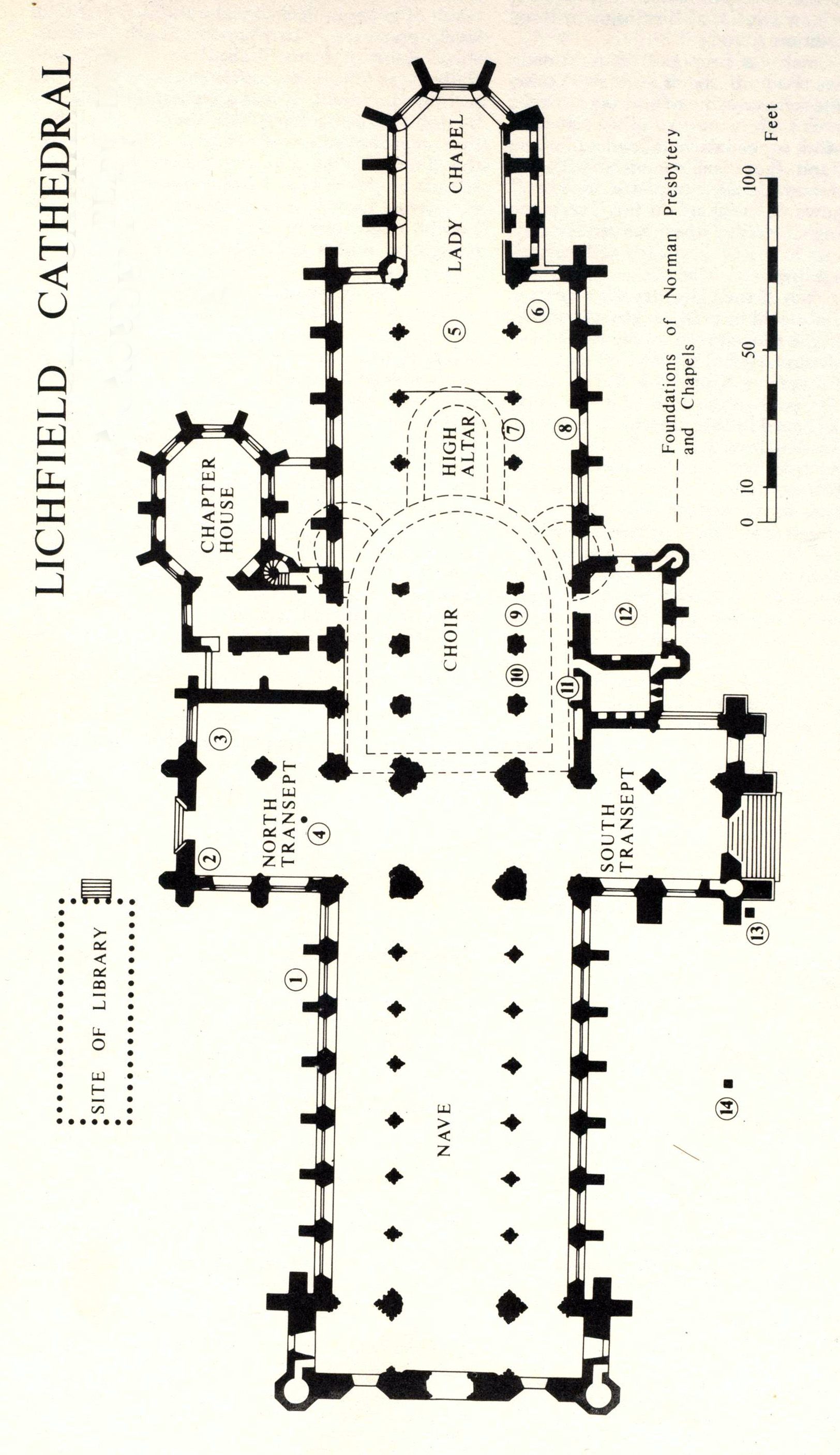
Ground plan of the cathedral

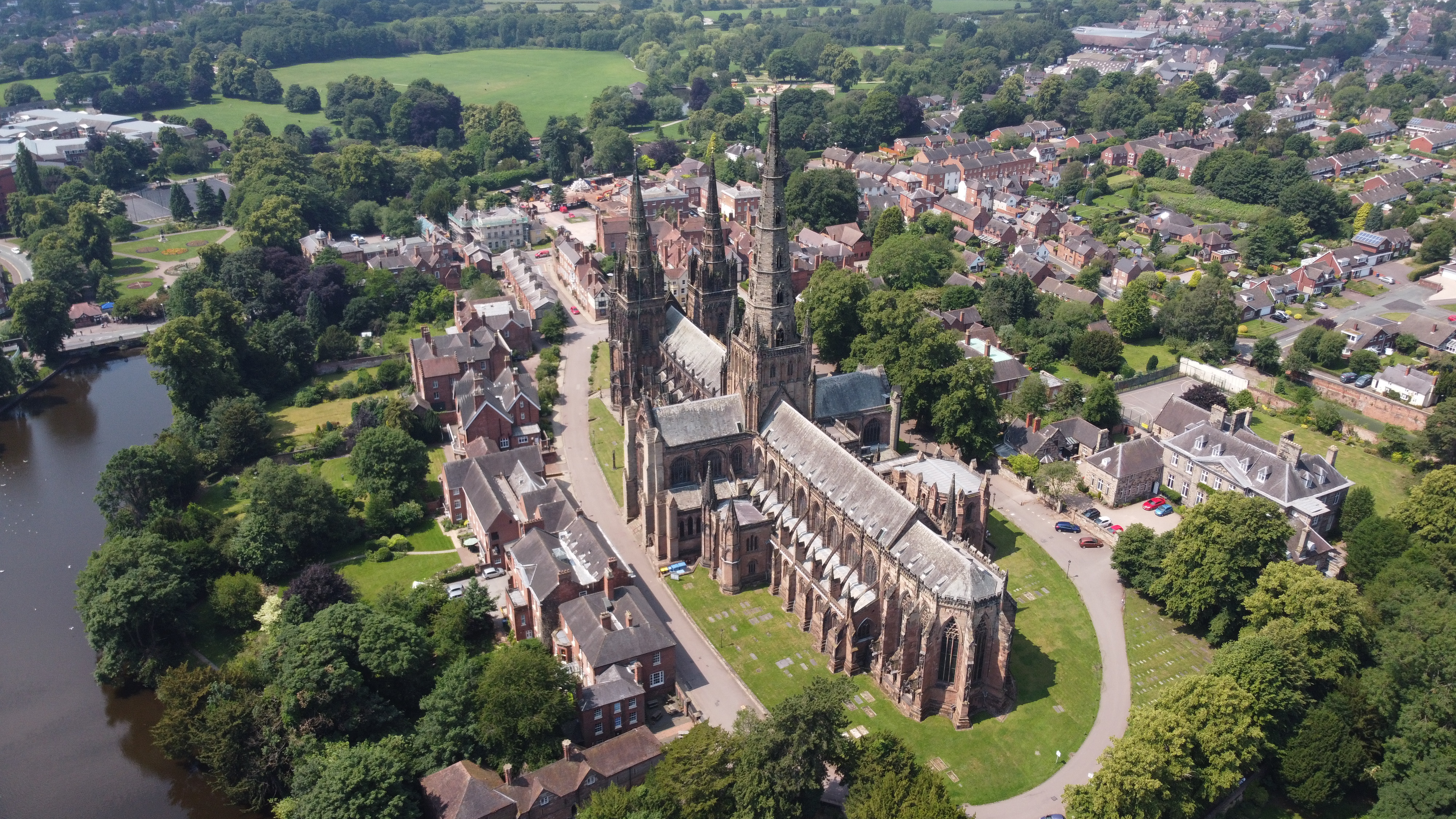
Aerial view, June 2020

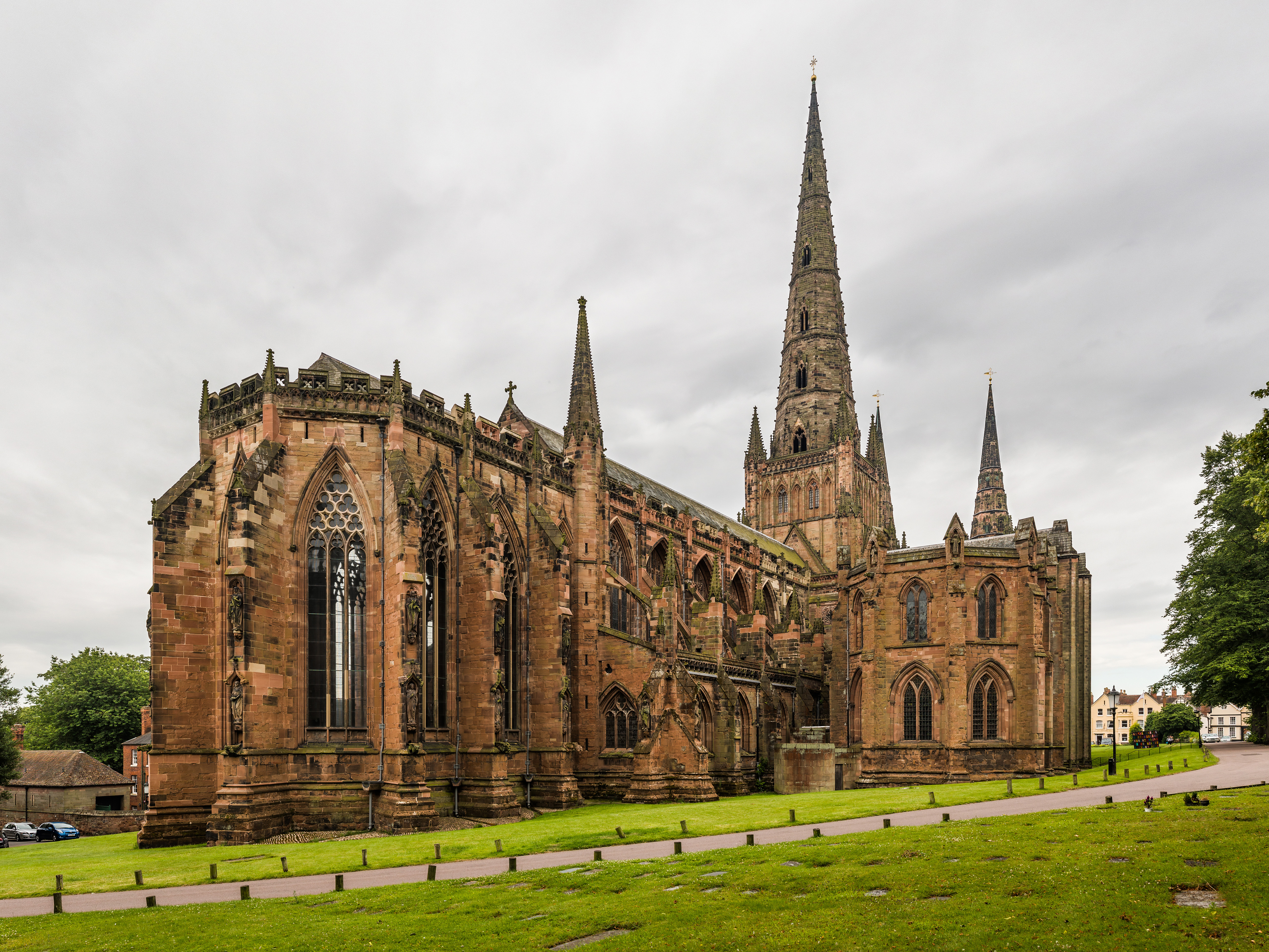
Exterior from the NE

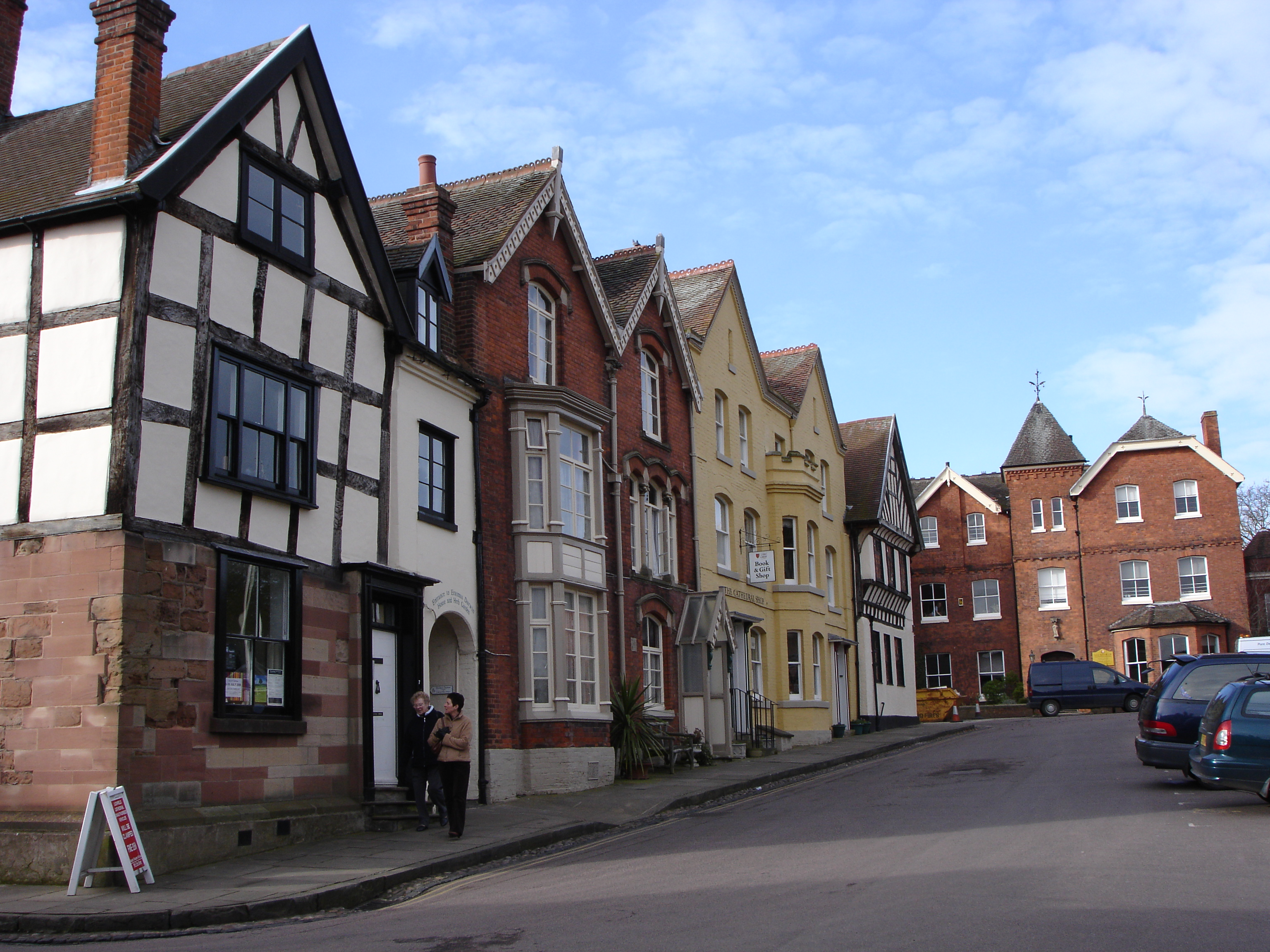
The Cathedral Close, Lichfield

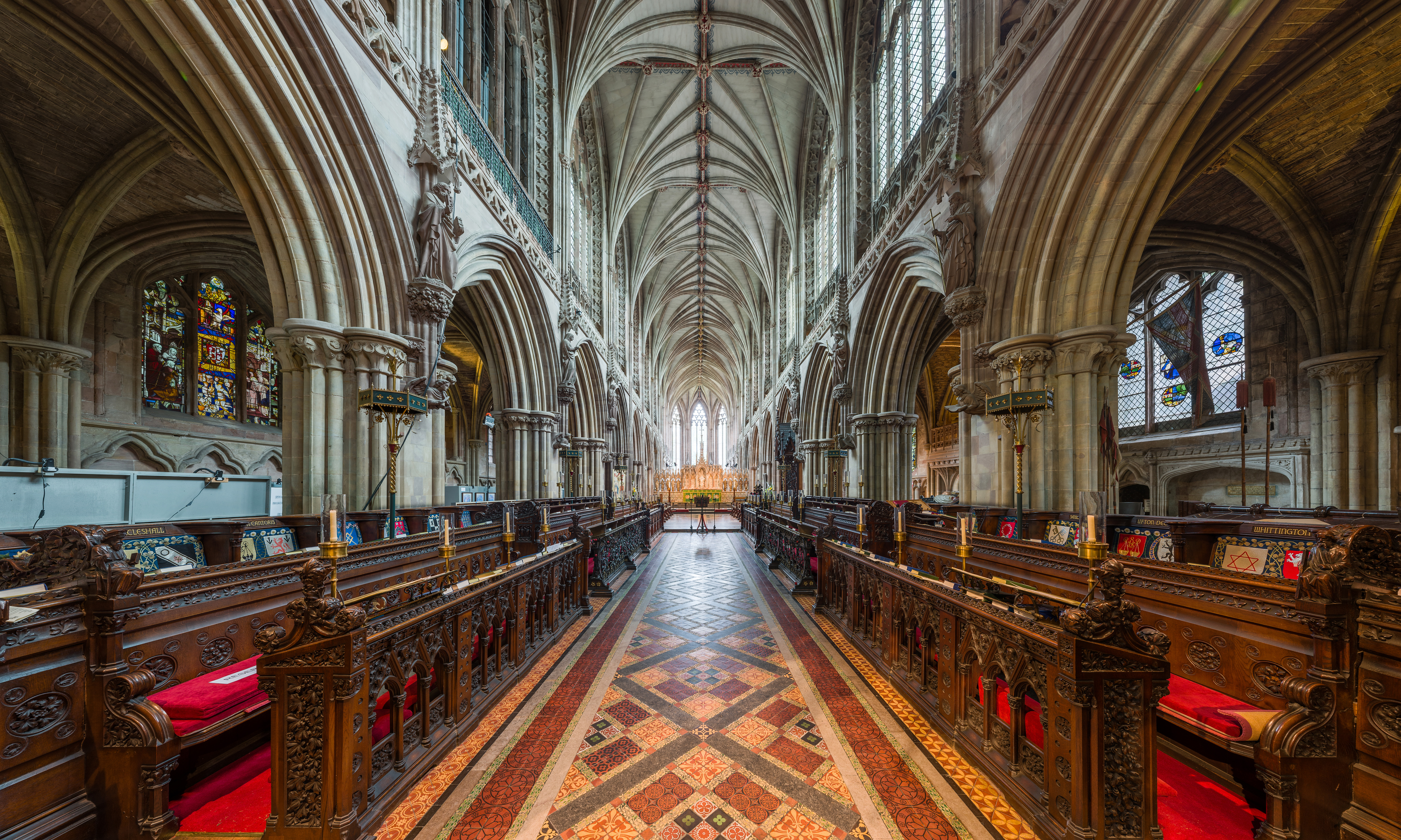
The cathedral choir

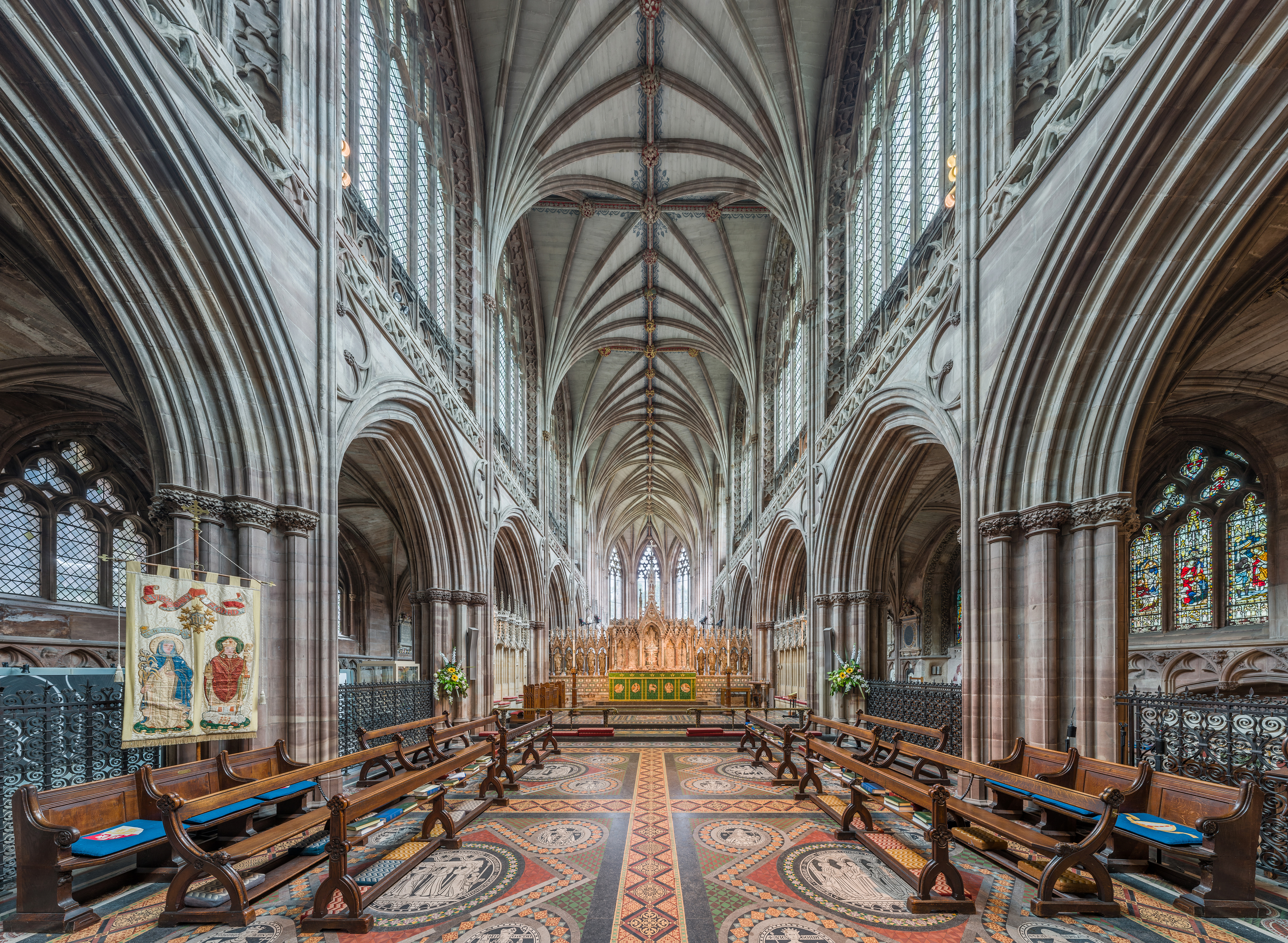
The high altar

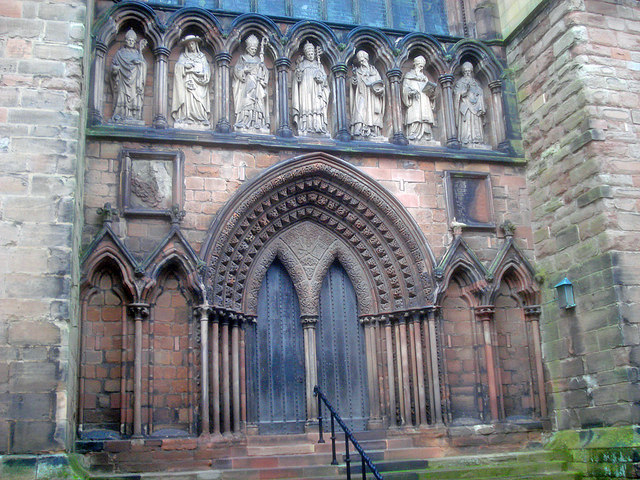
Above the ornate south doorway of Lichfield Cathedral stand seven figures carved in Roman cement. Figures from left to right, representing: Saints Augustine of Hippo, Jerome, Ambrose of Milan, Gregory the Great, John Chrysostom, Athanasius and Basil.

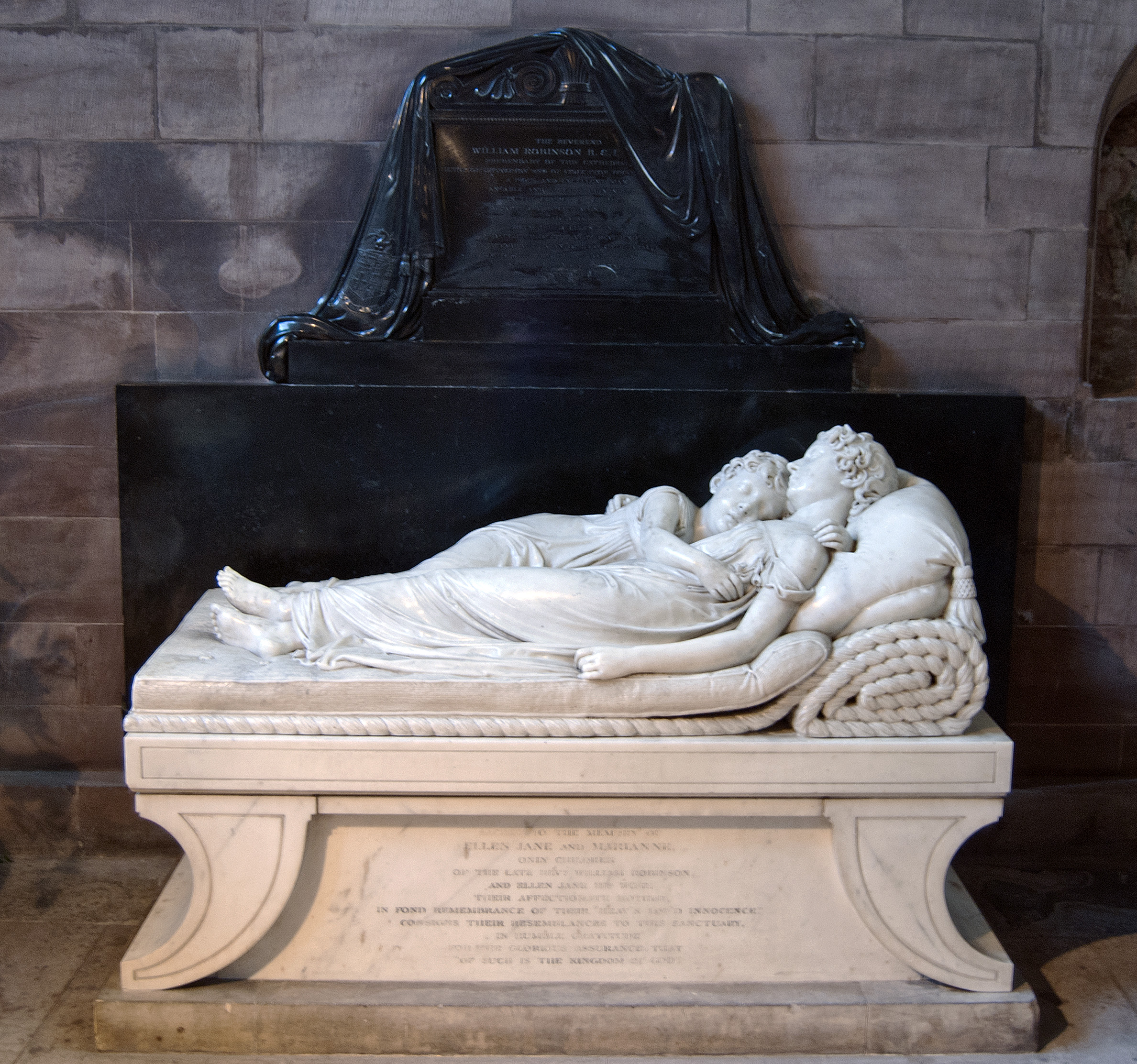
The Sleeping Children by Francis Chantrey (1817), portrays two young sisters, Ellen-Jane and Marianne Robinson, who died in tragic circumstances in 1813 and 1814

== History of the cathedral ==
=== Early history and elevation to archbishopric ===
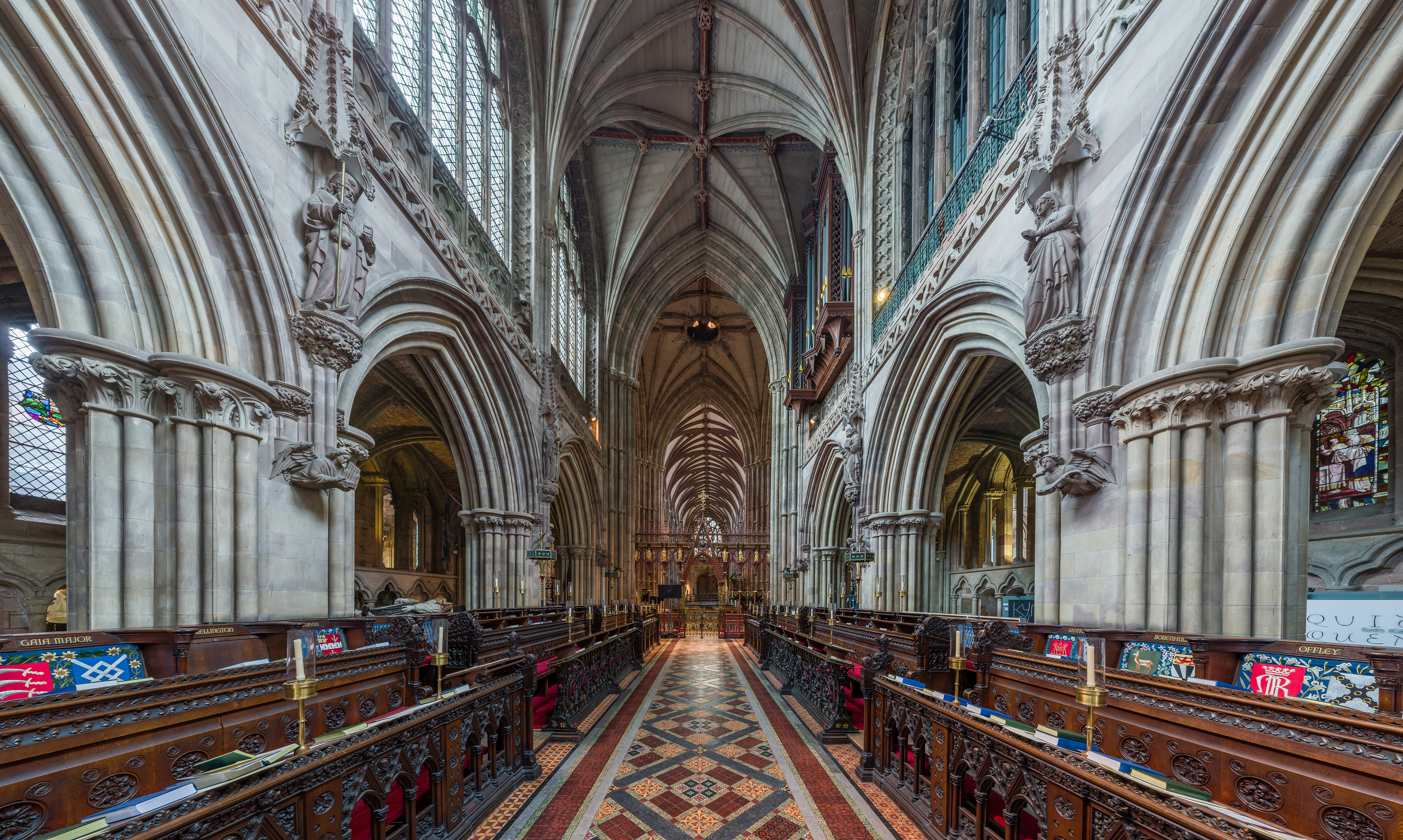
The cathedral's Choir, built around 1200

Bede stated that Chad established his see at Lichfield; and the first cathedral would presumably have been on this site in 669. When he died in 672, his grave site, near the church of St Mary, became a sacred shrine for many pilgrims. In 2003, excavations under the east end of the nave revealed a grave cut into the sandstone bedrock which has been attributed to Chad. It was within the foundation of a tower-like building seven metres square.

Map showing the dioceses of southern England during the reign of Offa of Mercia. The bold lines show the presumed boundaries between the three ecclesiastical provinces of Canterbury, Lichfield and York.

At the Council of Chelsea in 787, the Bishop of Lichfield, Hygeberht (or Higbert) was raised to the rank of archbishop and authority over the dioceses of Worcester, Hereford, Leicester, Lindsey, Dommoc and Elmham were transferred to Lichfield. This was due to the persuasion of Offa, King of Mercia, who wanted an archbishop to rival Canterbury. On Offa's death in 796, however, the Pope removed the archiepiscopal rank and restored the dioceses to the authority of the archbishop of Canterbury.

In 1854, a foundation, 1.5 metres wide and 1.7 metres high, was found under the choir and presbytery floor. This basilica-shaped foundation was recognised as the second cathedral. The Victorians assumed this was a Norman cathedral, but its shape, dimensions and material (much concrete hard mortar) suggest otherwise. It has yet to be carbon-dated and a case has been made that the church was built by Offa for his archbishopric. The date for construction of the present Gothic cathedral is unclear since all fabric accounts were destroyed in the Civil War sieges and early texts are ambiguous. The general opinion is that the cathedral was begun in the early 13th century. It was completed by the building of the Lady Chapel in the 1330s. The Choir dates from 1200, the Transepts from 1220 to 1240 and the Nave was started around 1260. The octagonal Chapter House, which was completed in 1249 and is one of the most beautiful parts of the cathedral with some charming stone carvings, houses an exhibition of the cathedral's greatest treasures, the Lichfield Gospels, an 8th-century illuminated manuscript and the Lichfield Angel stonework.

=== Devastation of the Civil War ===
In the English Civil War there were three sieges of Lichfield during 1643–1646 as the cathedral close was surrounded by a moat and defensive walls, which made it a natural fortress. Clergy followed Charles I, but the townsfolk generally sided with Parliament. Robert Greville, 2nd Baron Brooke, led an assault against it, but was killed by a musket shot said to be from John Dyott (known as 'dumb' because he was a deaf mute) who along with his brother Richard Dyott had taken up a position on the battlements on 2 March 1643. Brooke's deputy John Gell, took over the siege and the garrison surrendered to Gell two days later.

In April of the same year (1643) Prince Rupert led an Royalist expeditionary force from Oxford to recapture Lichfield. The siege started on 8 April. During the second assault Rupert's engineers detonated what is thought to be the first explosive mine to be used in England to breach the defences. Unable to defend the Close, Colonel Russell, the parliamentary commander of the garrison, surrendered on terms to Rupert on 21 April.

In 1646 the Parliamentarians were once again victorious, but the Cathedral suffered extensive damage: the central spire was demolished, the roofs ruined and all the stained glass smashed. Bishop Hacket began the restoration of the cathedral in the 1660s, aided by substantial funds donated by the restored monarch, but it was not until the 19th century that the damage caused by the Civil War was fully repaired. Until the 19th century, on top of an ornamented gable, between the two spires, stood a figure of Charles II, by William Wilson. The statue now stands just outside the south doors.

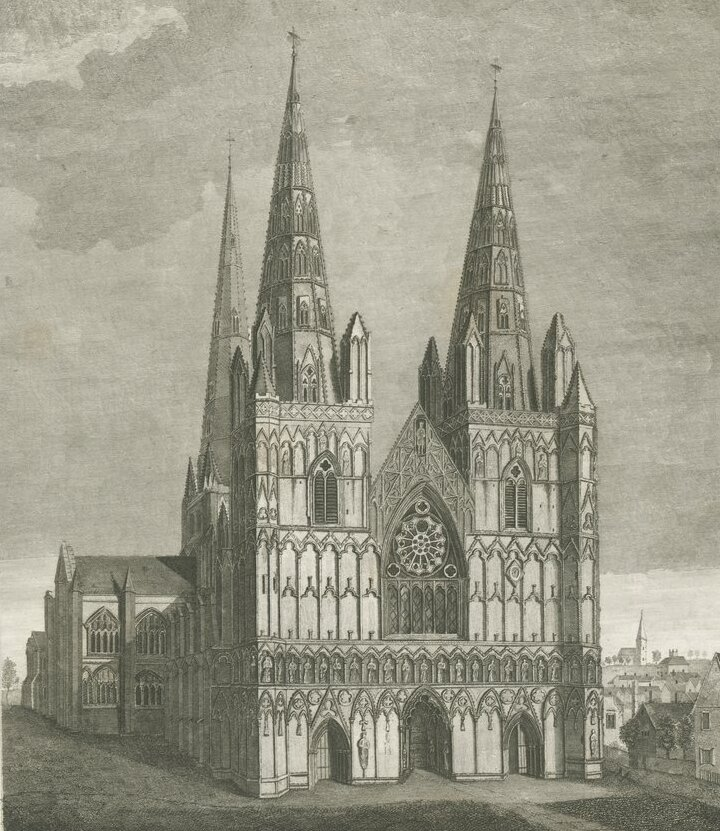
An engraving of the cathedral from Stebbing Shaw's 1798 History and Antiquities of Staffordshire, showing the west front mostly devoid of statues

=== Victorian restoration ===
Although the 18th century was a golden age for the city of Lichfield, it was a period of alteration for the cathedral. The 15th-century library, on the north side of the nave, was pulled down in 1798 and the books moved to their present location above the Chapter House. Most of the statues on the west front were removed and the stonework covered with Roman cement. At the end of the century James Wyatt organised some major structural work, removing the High Altar to make one long worship area of Choir, Presbytery and Lady Chapel and adding a massive stone screen with glass to the roof at the entrance to the Choir. Francis Eginton painted the east window and was commissioned by the chapter to do other work in the cathedral.

The ornate west front was extensively renovated in the Victorian era by George Gilbert Scott. It includes a remarkable number of ornate carved figures of kings, queens and saints, working with original materials where possible and creating fine new imitations and additions when the originals were not available. Between 1877 and 1884 the empty niches on the west front were given new statues, most carved by Robert Bridgeman of Lichfield: the statue of Queen Victoria on the north side of the central window was carved by her daughter, Princess Louise.

Wyatt's choir-screen had utilised medieval stone-work which Scott in turn used to create sedilia with clergy's seats in the sanctuary. The new metal screen by Francis Skidmore and John Birnie Philip to designs by Scott himself is a triumph of metalwork art, as are the fine Mintons tiles in the choir, inspired by the medieval ones found in the Choir foundations and some still seen in the Library.

=== Lichfield Angel ===
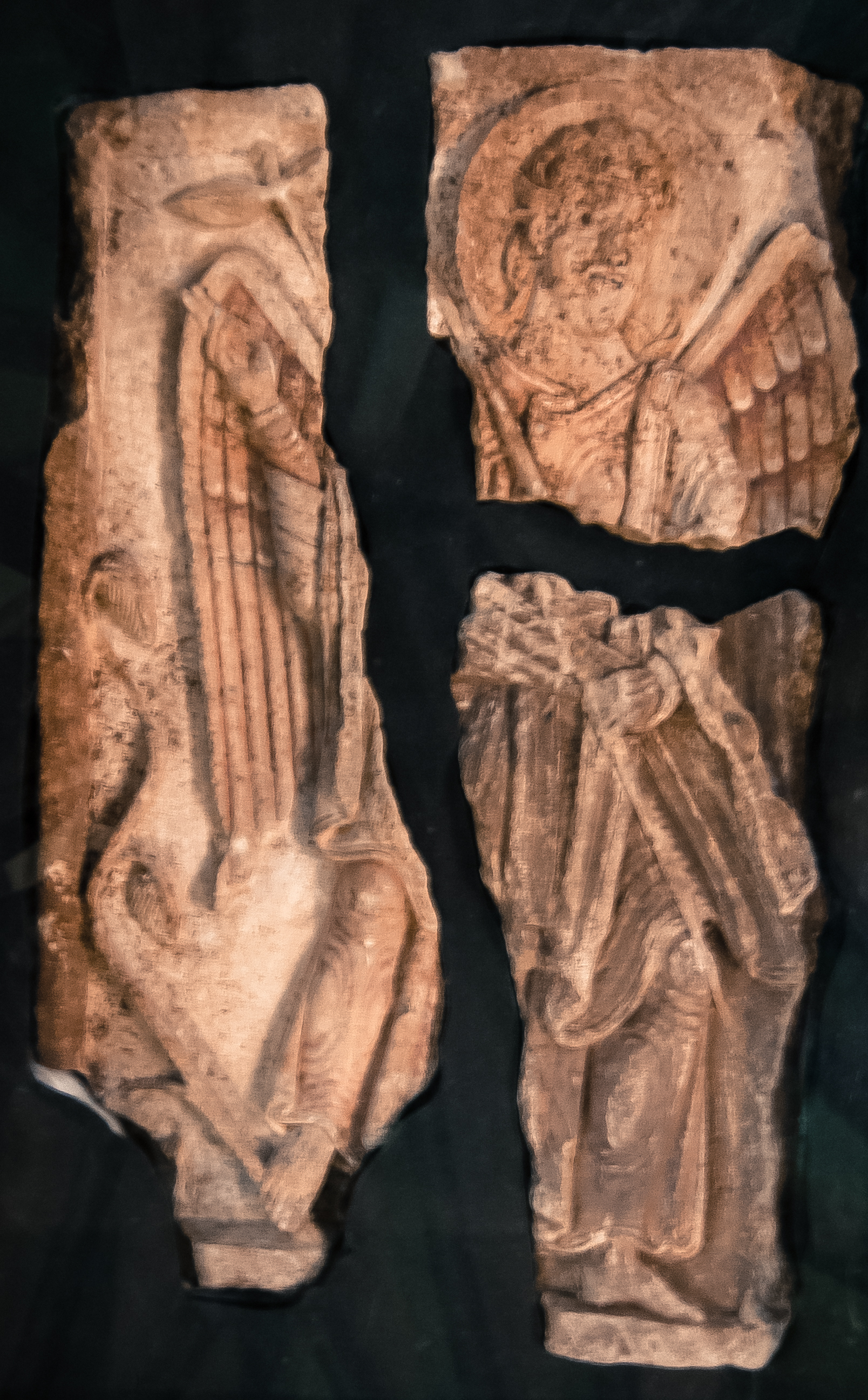
The Lichfield Angel carving

In February 2003, an 8th-century sculpted panel of the Archangel Gabriel was discovered under the nave of the cathedral in and near the grave of Chad. The 600 mm-tall panel is carved from Ancaster stone from Lincolnshire. It was part of a stone chest, which is thought to have contained the relics of St Chad. The panel was broken into three parts but was still otherwise intact and had traces of red, black, yellow and white pigment from the period. The pigments on the Lichfield Angel correspond closely to those of the Lichfield Gospels which have been dated between 720 and 740. The Angel was first unveiled to the public in 2006, when visitor numbers to the cathedral trebled. After being taken to Birmingham for eighteen months for examination, it is now exhibited in the cathedral.

=== COVID-19 pandemic ===
On 15 January 2021, while closed to services during the COVID-19 pandemic, Lichfield Cathedral became the first place of worship in England to accommodate the vaccination programme in the United Kingdom.

=== Shrine of St Chad ===
On the 7 and 8 November 2022 a new shrine to St Chad was consecrated and a relic of the saint was translated from the Roman Catholic St Chad's Cathedral, Birmingham, at two separate services.

== Royal Visits ==
Lichfield's role as a major national cathedral makes it a recurring location for royal engagements, and key royal visits include:

- Queen Elizabeth I, visited and stayed in the city from July 27 to August 3, 1575, as part of her "progress" around the nation, possibly staying at the Bishop's Palace in the Close.
- King Edward VII, while Prince of Wales, visited Lichfield in 1894 for the centenary celebrations of the Staffordshire Yeomanry.
- Queen Elizabeth II:
  - Visited in March 1988 to distribute the Royal Maundy money
  - returned in July 2011, she presented campaign medals at Lichfield Cathedral and attended a Service of Commemoration
- King Charles III visited Lichfield Cathedral on October 27, 2025.

== Dean and chapter ==
As of 7 December 2020:

- Dean: Jan McFarlane (Canon Residentiary and honorary assistant bishop since 3 April 2020)
- Canon Precentor: Vacant
- Canon Custos: Vacant
- Canon Chancellor: Gregory Platten (since 5 July 2020 collation)
- Canon Treasurer: vacant

The additional role of Vice Dean has been vacant since Anthony Moore's resignation in 2017.

=== Lay Chapter ===
- Bryan Ramsell
- Anne Parkhill
- Margaret Harding
- Peter Durrant

== Music ==
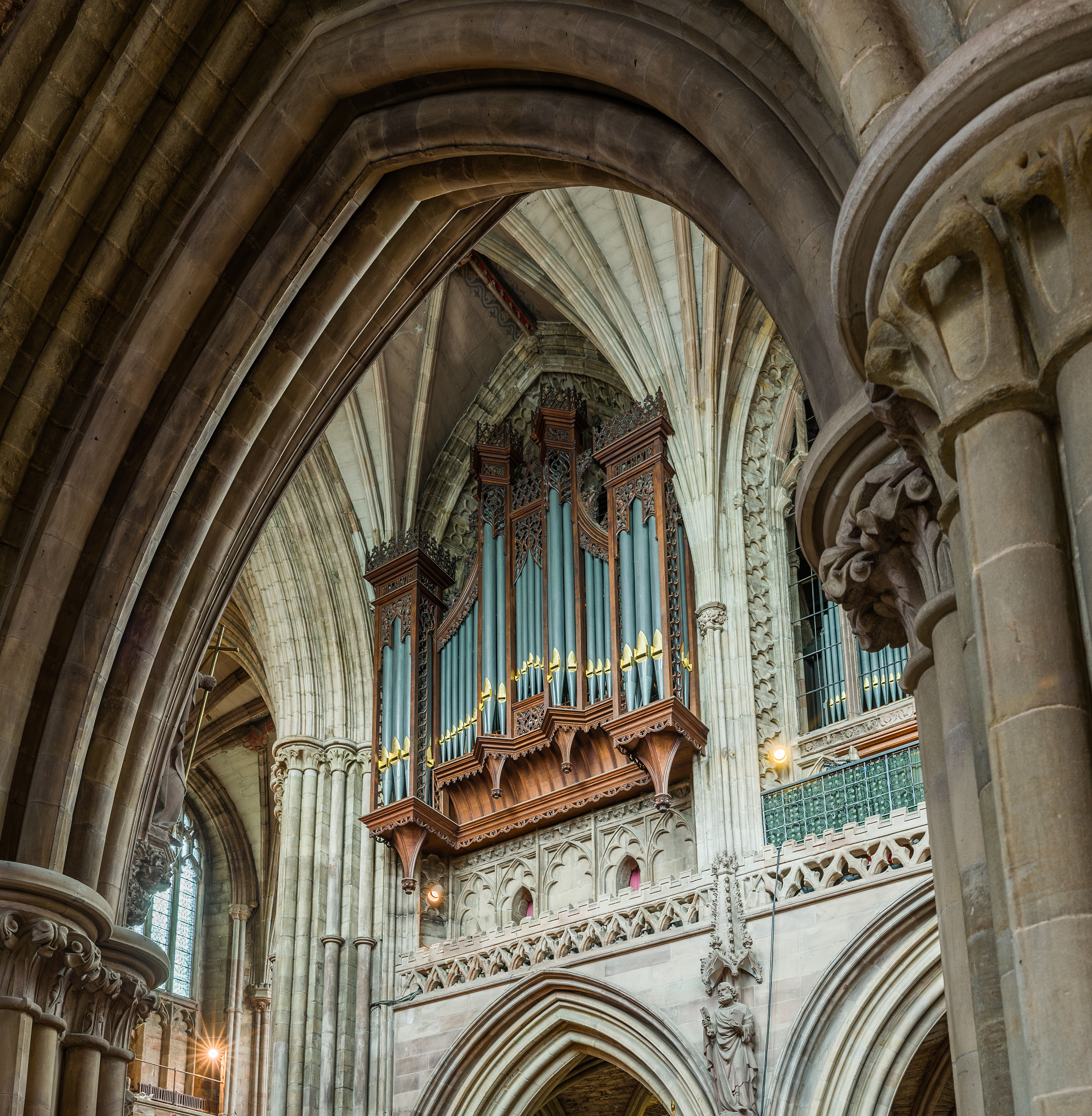
Lichfield Cathedral organ

=== Organ ===
An organ was built by Robert Dallam and installed in 1636. It had a short life as it was destroyed during the Commonwealth of England.

A replacement was purchased for £600 (equivalent to £124,600 in 2025) in 1667. This was damaged in 1745 by government forces pursuing Bonnie Prince Charlie. On 22 December 1772 the organ blower fell down the organ loft stairs and died. This instrument was purchased by Church of St Michael and All Angels, Hamstall Ridware in 1832 for £60 (equivalent to £5,800 in 2025).

In 1790 a new organ by Samuel Green was obtained comprising three manuals in a case built by James Wyatt. This instrument moved to St John the Baptist's Church, Armitage in the 1860s.

Another new organ, the gift of Josiah Spode of Hawkesyard, was installed in 1860 built by George Holdich with 2,507 pipes and 60 stops across three manuals and pedals. It was powered by three pairs of bellows, with double feeders, which required three men to operate.

William Hill provided the current instrument in 1884 at a cost of £2,000 (equivalent to £214,900 in 2025) which comprised 55 speaking stops. It was enlarged by William Hill in 1908 with the addition of 8 new stops. The current organ case was provided at this time when the organ was relocated. The case was designed by John Oldrid Scott with the carved woodwork executed by Mr. Bridgeman as a memorial to Arthur Heywood-Lonsdale. The case of the solo organ, removed to the transept was given by the same family a few years previously. At this time the entire organ was of tubular-pneumatic action with the exception of the five mechanical couplers. The blowing apparatus comprised Kinetic fans, driven by a gas engine in an underground chamber.

It was rebuilt by Hill, Norman and Beard in 1974 and increased in size to 66 stops. In 2000 Harrison and Harrison renovated and enlarged it with a new division of 13 additional stops.

The organ is tuned to a sharp pitch, C=540 Hz which is nearly a semitone sharp of modern concert pitch based on A=440 Hz.

=== Organists ===
Notable organists of Lichfield Cathedral include the 17th-century composer Michael East, and the musical educator and choral conductor William Henry Harris who conducted at the coronations of both George VI and Elizabeth II.

=== Priest vicars choral ===
- The Precentor's Vicar: Vacant
- The Dean's Vicar: Vacant
- The Chancellor's Vicar: Vacant
- The Treasurer's Vicar: Vacant

=== Lay vicars choral and choristers ===
The Choir has six lay vicars choral on staff and in 2021 reduced the full time equivalents from 9 to 6. In the front rows Lichfield has 18 boy choristers and up to 18 girl choristers. There are also sixth-form choral scholarships available.

== Bells ==
Following a fire, in 1477 Dean Thomas Heywood presented the Jesus Bell, which was cast in London. This bell was destroyed during the English Civil War. In 1670 Bishop John Hacket instigated the provision of six bells, but the installation took time and only the tenor had been installed at the time of his death. The total weight of the six bells was 13,200 cwt. In 1687 a subscription was raised to have them recast and the number increased to ten. The cathedral entered into an agreement with Henry Bagley of Northamptonshire with a completion date of 1691. The entire peel then weighted 14,900 cwt. Three of these bells were later re-cast by Rudhall of Gloucester, and Mears of London.

The ten bells were recast in 1947 by John Taylor of Loughborough, the expense being borne by the Freemasons of Staffordshire. The tenor weight is 3,537 pounds (1,604 kg).

== Clock ==
A clock was installed in 1891 by J. B. Joyce & Co of Whitchurch. It struck the hour on the tenor bell and the Cambridge quarters on the 1, 2, 3 and 6 bells. The horizontal frame was of cast iron 6 feet (1.8 m) long, 1 foot 9 inches (0.53 m) wide and 1 foot (0.30 m) in depth. The main wheels of the quarter and striking trains were 18 inches (46 cm) in diameter. The mechanism was regulated by Lord Grimthorpe’s gravity escapement. The pendulum obviated the effects of thermal expansion by being constructed of zinc and iron The pendulum beat was 1¼ seconds with a bob weight of 2 cwt. The time was shown on a dial in the belfry, and another in an ornamental case in the south aisle of the nave.

A few weeks after its installation, Lord Grimthorpe was inspecting it when the cathedral was struck by lightning.

== Burials ==
- Chad of Mercia, Bishop of the Northumbrians, later Bishop of the Mercians and Lindsey People, and Saint (c. 634–672) — originally buried in the Church of Saint Mary which became part of the cathedral. Some relics were eventually moved to St Chad's Cathedral, Birmingham
- Geoffrey de Muschamp, Bishop of Coventry (1198–1208) The location is unknown.
- William de Cornhill, Bishop of Coventry (1214–1223)
- Alexander de Stavenby, Bishop of Coventry and Lichfield (1224–1238)
- Hugh de Pateshull, Bishop of Coventry and Lichfield (1239–1241)
- Roger Weseham, Bishop of Coventry and Lichfield (1245–1256)
- Walter Langton, Lord High Treasurer of England and Bishop of Coventry and Lichfield (1296–1321)
- Anna Seward (1742–1809), known as 'the Swan of Lichfield', poet
- Henry Paget, 1st Marquess of Anglesey, KG, GCB, GCH, PC (1768–1854), cavalry officer during the Battle of Waterloo.
- George Augustus Selwyn, Bishop of Lichfield (1868–1878), first Anglican Bishop of New Zealand (1841–1858) and Primate of New Zealand (1858–1868)

== See also ==
- Architecture of the medieval cathedrals of England
- Bishops of Lichfield
- English Gothic architecture
- Lichfield Cathedral School
- Lichfield Gospels
- List of cathedrals in the United Kingdom
- List of Grade I listed buildings in Staffordshire
- Grade I listed churches in Staffordshire
- Listed buildings in Lichfield
- List of the Bishops of the Diocese of Lichfield and its precursor offices
- Mercian Trail

== General references ==
- Willis-Bund, John William (1905). The Civil War in Worcestershire, 1642–1646; and the Scotch Invasion of 1651. Birmingham: The Midland Educational Company. OCLC 767905615.
