= William Booth (bishop) =

Archbishop of York from 1452 to 1464

- Archbishop of York
- Appointed: 21 July 1452
- Term ended: 12 September 1464
- Predecessor: John Kemp
- Successor: George Neville

Orders
- Consecration: 9 July 1447

Personal details
- Born: c. 1388 Barton, Eccles, Lancashire
- Died: 12 September 1464 (aged 75–76) Bishopthorpe Palace, York
- Buried: Southwell Minster, Nottinghamshire
- Denomination: Catholic

William Booth or Bothe (c. 1388–1464) was Bishop of Coventry and Lichfield from 1447 before becoming Archbishop of York in 1452 until his death in 1464.

== Life ==
Prior to his election as Bishop of Coventry and Lichfield, Booth had served as Rector of Prescot, Lancashire from 1441. He was provided to the see of Coventry and Lichfield on 26 April 1447 and consecrated on 9 July 1447.

Booth was translated to the archdiocese of York on 21 July 1452. In the late summer of 1463, allied with the Neville brothers Richard, Earl of Warwick and John, Marquess of Montagu, Archbishop Booth led an army in the north of England which repelled an attempted invasion by the Scots and former King Henry VI with Margaret of Anjou.

Booth died the following year, on 12 September 1464, at Bishopthorpe Palace and is buried in a family vault at Southwell Minster.

== See also ==
- Archbishop Lawrence Booth (half-brother)
- Booth baronets

== Citations ==
Catholic Church titles
| Preceded by William Heyworth | Bishop of Coventry and Lichfield; 1447–1452 | Succeeded by Nicholas Close |
| Preceded by John Kemp | Archbishop of York; 1452–1464 | Succeeded by George Neville |
