= Roger Weseham =

13th-century Bishop of Coventry and Lichfield

- Bishop of Coventry and Lichfield
- Appointed: between 17 May and 4 July 1245
- Term ended: resigned November or December 1256
- Predecessor: Robert de Monte Pessulano
- Successor: Roger de Meyland
- Other post: Dean of Lincoln

Orders
- Consecration: between 17 May and 4 July 1245

Personal details
- Died: c. 20 May 1257
- Buried: Lichfield Cathedral
- Denomination: Catholic

Roger Weseham (also Roger de Weseham; died 1257) was an English Bishop of Coventry and Lichfield.

Weseham was probably a native of Weasenham, Norfolk, and was educated at Oxford University. He graduated with a master's in arts before 1233. He was then a lecturer at Oxford University. He was Archdeacon of Oxford by May 1237 until 1240, when he was appointed Dean of Lincoln by Robert Grosseteste, who had made Roger a protégé. He was nominated as a bishop and consecrated between 17 May and 4 July 1245.

While bishop, Weseham wrote an Instituta for his clergy, in order to teach them Christian doctrine and help them select sermon topics. One of the subjects he wanted his clergy to cover the basics tenets of the Christian faith. To do this, he listed all the doctrines in the Apostles' Creed, and covered possible sermon themes relating to each doctrine. He also gathered learned men around him, including the Franciscan Brother Vincent, John of Basingstoke, a Greek scholar, and Ralph de Sempringham, who became Chancellor of the University of Oxford.

Weseham resigned the see in November or December 1256 and died about 20 May 1257. He resigned due to paralysis. He was buried in Lichfield Cathedral.

== Citations ==
Catholic Church titles
Preceded by Robert de Monte Pessulano	Bishop of Coventry and Lichfield; 1245–1256	Succeeded by Roger de Meyland
