= Aldwine =

8th-century Bishop of Lichfield and Bishop of Leicester

- Bishop of Lichfield and of Leicester
- Appointed: between 716 and 727
- Term ended: 737
- Predecessor: Headda
- Successor: Witta

Orders
- Consecration: between 716 and 727

Personal details
- Died: 737

Aldwine (Note: Or Aldwyn, Ealdwine, Uuor, or Wor) (died 737) was a medieval Bishop of Lichfield and Bishop of Leicester.

== History ==
Around 721 Aldwine succeeded Headda as bishop of the Mercians; his see was at Lichfield. He held the see of Leicester at the same time as he was at Lichfield. Between the years 723 and 737, Aldwine witnessed a charter of Æthelbald of Mercia granting to the Earl Aethilric 20 hides of land to build the minster of St. Mary at Wootton Wawen. In June 731, he participated in the consecration of the Mercian abbot Tatwine as Archbishop of Canterbury.

Aldwine died in 737.

== Citations ==
Christian titles
Preceded by Headda	Bishop of Lichfield c. 721–737	Succeeded by Witta
Preceded by Headda	Bishop of Leicester c. 721–737	Succeeded by Torhthelm
