= Headda =

7th and 8th-century Bishop of Lichfield and Bishop of Leicester

- Bishop of Lichfield and of Leicester
- Installed: c. 691 (Lichfield) c. 709 (Leicester)
- Term ended: c. 721 (death)
- Predecessor: Seaxwulf (Lichfield); Wilfrid (Leicester)
- Successor: Aldwine

Orders
- Consecration: 691

Personal details
- Died: c. 721

Headda (Note: Or Headdus or Eatheadus of Sidnacester) (died c. 721) was an early medieval Bishop of Lichfield. (Note: For "Sidnacester", see Bishop of Lindsey)

== Career ==
Headda was consecrated in 691 and died between 716 and 727. He held the see of Leicester along with Lichfield. In 706 Headda consecrated the new church constructed at Crowland by Guthlac.

Prior to Headda's consecration, he had "almost certainly" been abbot of the monastery at Breedon on the Hill in Leicestershire, before which he may also have been a monk at Medeshamstede.

== Citations ==
Christian titles
Preceded by Seaxwulf	Bishop of Lichfield; 691–c. 721	Succeeded by Aldwine
Preceded by Wilfrid	Bishop of Leicester; 709–c. 721	Succeeded by Aldwine
