= Hereford Gospels =

8th-century illuminated manuscript

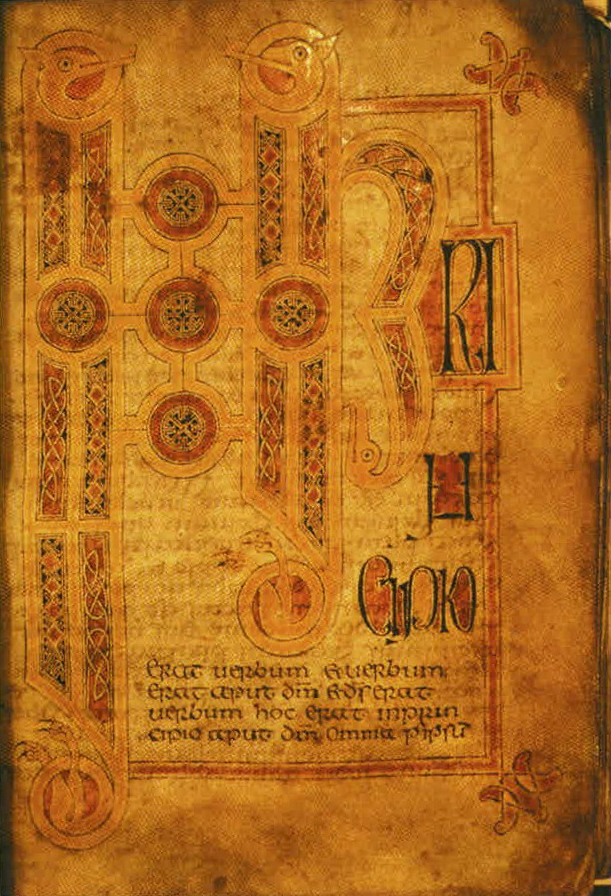
The Hereford Gospels, circa 780, illustrating the Gospel of John

The Hereford Gospels (Hereford, Hereford Cathedral Library, MS P. I. 2) is an 8th-century illuminated manuscript gospel book in insular script (minuscule), with large illuminated initials in the Insular style. This is a very late Anglo-Saxon gospel book, which shares a distinctive style with the Caligula Troper (Cotton Library, MS Caligula A.xiv). An added text suggests this was in the diocese of Hereford in the 11th century.

The manuscript was likely produced either in Wales (like the Ricemarch Psalter [In the Doomsday books Hereford is referred to as Hereford, Wales] and possibly the Lichfield Gospels) or in the West Country of England near the Welsh border. Correspondences with the Lichfield Gospels include roughly 650 variances from the Vulgate, suggestive that the two manuscripts result from a similar textual tradition.

Like other Insular manuscripts, the decoration has features relating to pre-Christian Celtic art, featuring spirals, tri-partite divisions of circles, common in the La Tene style, as well as Germanic and Mediterranean elements.

It is now housed in Hereford Cathedral in the largest surviving chained library, a library in which the books are chained so as to prevent theft.

This book should not be confused with a different manuscript sometimes known as the "Hereford Gospels", now held at Pembroke College, Cambridge as MS 302.
