= Berhthun (bishop) =

8th-century Bishop of Lichfield

- Bishop of Lichfield
- Appointed: c. 769
- Term ended: c.778
- Predecessor: Cuthfrith
- Successor: Hygeberht

Orders
- Consecration: c. 769

Personal details
- Died: c. 778

Berhthun (or Beorhthun; died c. 778) was a medieval Bishop of Lichfield.

Berhthun was consecrated about 769 and died between 777 and 779.

== Citations ==
Christian titles
Preceded by Cuthfrith	Bishop of Lichfield c. 768–c. 778	Succeeded by Hygeberht
