= Ricemarch Psalter =

The Ricemarch Psalter, circa 1079, the start of Psalm 1:"Beatus vir..."

The Ricemarch Psalter is an 11th-century Welsh illuminated psalter, in a late Insular style, that has been described as "Hiberno-Danish", instead of the usual "Hiberno-Saxon", as it reflects Viking influence. Its 159 folios are vellum, and include the following sections: Letter of St. Jerome to Chromatius and Elidorus; Breviarius Apostolorum; Martyrologium Hieronymianum, and Various Tables. It is one of two surviving manuscripts from the scriptorium at Llanbadarn Fawr in Wales, established by the father of the scribe and the first owner. The other is a manuscript of St. Augustine's De Trinitate in Cambridge, by the same scribe. The psalter is now at Trinity College Dublin as MS 50.

== History ==
The Psalter was presented between 1064 and 1082 by a scribe named Ithael to his brother Rhygyfarch (Ricemarch in the Old Welsh orthography of the eleventh century), who was a resident of the school at St. David's. Their father, Sulien (Latinized as Sulgenus), who would eventually become the Bishop of St. David's in 1072, had previously lived in Ireland for 13 years for the purpose of study; the decoration is heavily influenced by contemporary Irish styles.

== Style ==
It is possible that Rhygyfarch penned a few sections of the manuscript himself, as the hand is not always consistent. He certain composed several verses himself, even if he did not scribe those sections of manuscript. Hugh Jackson Lawlor is of the opinion that the psalter was not written primarily by Rhygyfarch himself, as mentioned above, unlike other scholars. The large initials in the beginning lines of the manuscript pages are typical of other illuminated manuscripts of the time, with colorful Celtic interlace with animals. It is likely that Ithael wrote the text, while John provided the large initials and miniatures. The designs, while limited in variety, are highly regarded by scholars of illuminated manuscripts.

Other Insular illuminated manuscripts from Wales may include the Lichfield Gospels and the Hereford Gospels.
