= Cynesige of Lichfield =

10th-century Bishop of Lichfield

Cynesige
- Bishop of Lichfield
- Appointed: between 946 and 949
- Term ended: between 963 and 964
- Predecessor: Ælfwine
- Successor: Wynsige

Orders
- Consecration: between 946 and 949

Personal details
- Died: between 963 and 964

Cynesige (Note: Or Kynsy or Kinsey or Kinsius) (died c. 963) was a medieval Bishop of Lichfield.

Cynesige was consecrated between 946 and 949 and died between 963 and 964. He was a relative of Dunstan and left the king's court soon after the coronation of King Eadwig of England in January 956, along with Dunstan who was Abbot of Glastonbury at the time. The Life of Dunstan states that the reason the bishop and abbot were dismissed from court was that they denounced the new king and his new bride Ælfgifu.

== Citations ==
Christian titles
Preceded by Ælfwine	Bishop of Lichfield c. 963–c. 963	Succeeded by Wynsige
