= Ælfwine of Lichfield =

10th-century Bishop of Lichfield

Ælfwine
- Bishop of Lichfield
- Appointed: between 903 and 915
- Term ended: between 935 and 941
- Predecessor: Wilferth
- Successor: Wulfgar

Orders
- Consecration: between 903 and 915

Personal details
- Died: between 935 and 941

Ælfwine or Ælle was a medieval Bishop of Lichfield. He was consecrated between 903 and 915 and died between 935 and 941.

Ælfwine appears to have had a close relationship with King Æthelstan. Ælfwine was probably close to Æthelstan before he became king, and consistently attested the king's charters in a more prominent position than his status should have entitled him to. The historian Sarah Foot has suggested that Ælfwine may have been the "Æthelstan A", the name given by historians to the draftsman who crafted unusually detailed charters between 928 and 935, as he ceased witnessing at the same time as the Æthelstan A charters ended.

== Citations ==
Christian titles
Preceded by Wilferth	Bishop of Lichfield c. 909–c. 938	Succeeded by Wulfgar
