= James Cary (bishop) =

British religious leader

James Cary, or John Cary was a supposed English bishop. It is said that he was Bishop of Coventry and Lichfield (1419), and was translated to be Bishop of Exeter, but died before taking up the latter office. On the other hand, according to Fasti ecclesiae Anglicanae Vol. 1

According to Godwin, James or John Cary, bishop of Lichfield and Goventry, succeeded bishop Gatrik in Exeter; but there is no evidence of this, any more than of his having been bishop of Lichfield and Coventry.
