= Wynsige of Lichfield =

10th-century Bishop of Lichfield

Wynsige
- Bishop of Lichfield
- Appointed: between 963 and 964
- Term ended: 975
- Predecessor: Cynesige
- Successor: Elphege

Orders
- Consecration: between 963 and 964

Personal details
- Died: 975

Wynsige (Note: Or Wynsy or Winsey or Winsius) (died 975) was a medieval Bishop of Lichfield.

Wynsige was consecrated between 963 and 964 and died in 975.

== Citations ==
Christian titles
Preceded by Cynesige	Bishop of Lichfield c. 963–975	Succeeded by Elphege
