= Bishop of Lichfield =

Diocesan bishop in the Church of England

- Bishopric

anglican
- Incumbent; Michael Ipgrave

Location
- Ecclesiastical province: Canterbury
- Residence: Bishop's House, Lichfield

Information
- First holder: Diuma; Winfrith (first bishop at Lichfield)
- Established: 7th century AD
- Diocese: Lichfield
- Cathedral: Lichfield Cathedral

The Bishop of Lichfield is the ordinary of the Church of England Diocese of Lichfield in the Province of Canterbury. The diocese covers 4,516 km^{2} (1,744 sq. mi.) of the counties of Powys, Staffordshire, Shropshire, Warwickshire and West Midlands. The bishop's seat is located in the Cathedral Church of the Blessed Virgin Mary and Saint Chad in the city of Lichfield. The Bishop's residence is the Bishop's House, Lichfield, in the cathedral close. In the past, the title has had various forms (see below). The current bishop is Michael Ipgrave, following the confirmation of his election on 10 June 2016.

== History ==
The Anglo-Saxon dioceses before 925

The diocese of Mercia was founded 656 with Diuma as its first bishop; according to Bede he was at the same time the Bishop of Lindisfarne and of the Middle Angles, amongst whom he died. When Chad was made Bishop in 669, his seat was at Lichfield, thus the diocese was named after that city. In 691 the area over which the bishop held authority was divided to form the smaller dioceses of Lichfield, Leicester, Lindsey and Worcester.

It was briefly the seat of an archbishop under Hygeberht from 787 to 799 (officially dissolved in 803) during the ascendancy of the kingdom of Mercia. Offa, King of Mercia seemed to resent his own bishops paying allegiance to the Archbishop of Canterbury in Kent who, whilst under Offa's control, was not of his own kingdom of Mercia. Offa therefore created his own archbishopric in Lichfield, who presided over all the bishops from the Humber to the Thames, in 786, with the consent of Pope Adrian I. The Pope's official representatives were received warmly by Offa and were present at the Council of Chelsea (787), often called 'the contentious synod', where it was proposed that the Archbishopric of Canterbury be restricted in order to make way for Offa's new archbishop. It was vehemently opposed, but Offa and the papal representatives defeated Jænberht, Archbishop of Canterbury, installing Hygeberht as the new Archbishop of Lichfield. Pope Adrian sent Hygeberht his ceremonial garment, obviously denoting his support for this move. In gratitude, Offa promised to send an annual shipment of gold to the pope for alms and supplying the lights in St. Peter's church in Rome. However the Archbishopric of Lichfield only lasted for 16 years, ending after Offa's death, when at the Fifth Council of Clovesho its dioceses were restored to Æthelhard, Archbishop of Canterbury by Pope Leo III.

The bishop's seat was briefly moved to Chester in 1075, but by 1102 was in Coventry. From 1228 Bishop of Coventry and Lichfield became the official title with seats at both cathedrals, though various older names remained in common usage.

After the Reformation of the 1530s the cathedral at Coventry was demolished, and after the Restoration of Charles II in 1660 the bishop used the style Bishop of Lichfield and Coventry. In 1837 the ancient bishopric was divided. The archdeaconry of Coventry (comprising northern and eastern Warwickshire) was transferred to the see of Worcester and the style Bishop of Lichfield adopted.

== List of bishops ==
Bishop of the Mercians
From	Until	Incumbent	Notes
?	aft 655	Diuma	Dwyna; Duma.
dates unclear		Ceollach	Cellach, a Scot; resigned and returned to Scotland.
c658	c 662	Trumhere	Trumhere, Abbot of Ingethling.
c 662	c 667	Jaruman	
Bishop of the Mercians and Lindsey people (based at Lichfield)
669	672	Chad	Saint Chad; Ceadda. Translated from York. After his consecration was first declared invalid and then restored; died in office.
Bishops of Lichfield
672	c674	Winfrith	Winfride; Winfrid. Deprived by Theodore, Archbishop of Canterbury.
c 676	bef 692	Seaxwulf	Saxulf; Sexulf. Abbot of Medeshamstede (Peterborough); Saint Sexwulf.
691	bet 716–727	Headda	Headdi; Eatheadus of Sidnacester.
bef 731	737	Aldwine	Aldwyn; Aldwini.
737	bet 749–767	Witta	Huitta.
bef 757	765	Hemele	Hemel.
c 765	c 769	Cuthfrith	Cuthred; died in office.
c 769	bet 777–779	Berhthun	Died in office.
779	787	Hygeberht	Higbert; created Archbishop by King Offa in 787.
Archbishop of Lichfield
787	799	Hygeberht	Higbert; Bishop until 787.
Bishops of Lichfield
From	Until	Incumbent	Notes
bet 799–801	bet 814–816	Ealdwulf	Adulphus; title of Archbishop laid aside.
bet 814–816	bet 817–818	Herewine	
818	830	Æthelwold	
830	bet 830–836	Hunberght	Humbert II.
bet 830–836	bet 841–845	Cynefrith	Cumbert; Cineferth; Saint Cumbert.
bet 843–845	bet 857–862	Tunberht	Tunbright; Tunfrith; Tumfriht.
bet 857–862	bet 866–869	Wulfsige	
bet 866–869	bet 875–883	Eadberht	or perhaps Burgheard
bet 875–883	bet 889–900	Wulfred	
bet 889–900	bet 909–915	Wilferth	or Wigmund; omitted from Haydn's.
bet 903–915	bet 935–941	Ælfwine	
bet 935–941	bet 946–949	Wulfgar	
bet 946–949	bet 963–964	Cynesige	Kinsey; Kynsy; Kinsius.
bet 963–964	975	Wynsige	Winsey; Winsius.
975	bet 1002–1004	Elphege	
bet 1002–1004	after 1017	Godwin	
after 1017	bet 1026–1027	Leofgar	Leosgar.
c 1027	1039	Brihtmær	Brithmar.
1039	1053	Wulfsige	Wulsy.
1053	1067	Leofwin	Abbot of Coventry.
1067	1075	Peter	In accordance with the decree of the Council of London (1075), removed see to Chester.
Bishops of Chester
1075	1085	Peter	
1086	1102	Robert de Limesey	Prebendary of St Paul's; removed see to Coventry.
Bishops of Coventry
From	Until	Incumbent	Notes
1102	1117	Robert de Limesey	As above, title change only; died in office.
1117	1121	Vacant for 4 years	
1121	1126	Robert Peche	Robert Pecham. Chaplain to Henry I; died in office.
1126	1129	Vacant for 2 years	
1129	1148	Roger de Clinton, Bishop of Lichfield and Coventry	Also called Bishop of Lichfield & Bishop of Coventry and Lichfield.
1149	1159	Walter Durdent	
1161	1182	Richard Peche	
1183	1184	Gerard la Pucelle	
1184	1188	Vacant	
1188	1198	Hugh Nonant	
1198	1208	Geoffrey de Muschamp	
1208	1215	Vacant due to interdict by Pope Innocent III against King John's realms.	
1215	1223	William de Cornhill	
1224	1228	Alexander de Stavenby	Became Bishop of Coventry and Lichfield.
Bishops of Coventry and Lichfield
From	Until	Incumbent	Notes
1228	1238	Alexander de Stavenby	Previously Bishop of Coventry.
1239		William de Raley	William Raleigh; elected by both the chapter of Coventry and that of Lichfield but being also elected Norwich he accepted that office.
1239		Nicholas Farnham	Elected by the Chapter of Coventry but did not take office, later Bishop of Durham.
1239		William de Manchester	Dean of Lichfield; elected by the Chapter of Lichfield but did not take office
1239	December 1241	Hugh de Pateshull	Lord Treasurer; accepted after much controversy between the two chapters and at Henry III's request; confirmed 25 December 1239; died in office.
December 1241	8 December 1241	Richard le Gras	Abbot of Evesham, elected but declined office or died before the disputed election was resolved.
December 1241	1245	Vacant	
1243		Robert de Monte Pessulano	Elected but refused the appointment, finding the election disagreeable to Henry III.
1245	1256	Roger Weseham	Dean of Lincoln; appointed by Pope Innocent IV.
1258	1295	Roger de Meyland	Roger Longespée; Roger de Molend.
1296	1321	Walter Langton	Lord Treasurer and Lord Chancellor.
1322	1358	Roger Northburgh	Roger de Northbrugh; Archdeacon of Richmond; Lord Keeper and Lord Treasurer.
1360	1385	Robert de Stretton	Canon of Lichfield.
1386	1386	Walter Skirlaw	Dean of St Martin's; translated to Bath & Wells.
1386	1398	Richard le Scrope	Translated to York.
1398	1414	John Burghill	Translated from Llandaff.
1415	1419	John Catterick	John Keterich; translated from St Davids; translated to Exeter.
1419	1419	James Cary	translated to Exeter but died before taking office thereof.
20 November 1420	13 March 1447	William Heyworth	
1447	1452	William Booth	Prebendary of St Paul's, London; translated to York.
1452		Nicholas Close	Translated from Carlisle; Chancellor of Cambridge.
1453	1459	Reginald Boulers	Translated from Hereford.
1459	1490	John Hales	John Halse. Prebendary of St Paul's, London.
1493	1496	William Smyth	Archdeacon of Surrey; translated to Lincoln.
1496	1502	John Arundel	Dean of Exeter; translated to Exeter.
1503	1531	Geoffrey Blythe	Geoffry Blyth. Dean of York.
1534	1539	Rowland Lee	Chancellor and Prebendary of Lichfield and Lord President of Wales. Title changed when Coventry Cathedral was dissolved.
Bishops of Lichfield and Coventry
From	Until	Incumbent	Notes
1539	1543	Rowland Lee	Previously Bishop of Coventry and Lichfield, before the Dissolution of the Monasteries.
1543	1554	Richard Sampson	Translated from Chichester; Lord President of Wales.
1554	1559	Ralph Baines	The last Roman Catholic Bishop of Lichfield and Coventry; deprived and died soon after.
1560	1579	Thomas Bentham	Fellow of Magdalen College, Oxford.
1580	1609	William Overton	Prebendary of Winchester and Salisbury.
1609	1610	George Abbot	Dean of Winchester; translated to London.
1610	1614	Richard Neile	Translated from Rochester; translated to Lincoln.
1614	1618	John Overall	Dean of St Paul's, London; translated to Norwich.
1619	1632	Thomas Morton	Translated from Chester; translated to Durham.
1632	1643	Robert Wright	Translated from Bristol.
1644	1646	Accepted Frewen	Dean of Gloucester; deprived of the see when the English episcopy was abolished by Parliament on 9 October 1646.
1646	1660	The see was abolished during the Commonwealth and the Protectorate.	
1660	1660	Accepted Frewen	Restored; translated to York, 4 October 1660.
1661	1670	John Hacket	Canon-resident of St Paul's, London.
1671	1692	Thomas Wood	Dean of Lichfield.
1692	1699	William Lloyd	Translated from St Asaph; translated to Worcester.
1699	1717	John Hough	Translated from Oxford; translated to Worcester.
1717	1730	Edward Chandler	Prebendary of Worcester; translated to Durham.
1731	1749	Richard Smalbroke	Translated from St Davids.
1750	1768	Frederick Cornwallis	Canon of Windsor; Dean of St Paul's, London (1766); translated to Canterbury.
1768	1771	John Egerton	Translated from Bangor; translated to Durham.
1771	1774	Brownlow North	Dean of Canterbury; translated to Worcester.
1775	1781	Richard Hurd	Master of the Temple; translated to Worcester.
1781	1824	James Cornwallis	Earl Cornwallis after 1823. Dean of Canterbury; nephew of Frederick Cornwallis (above); died in office.
10 March 1824	31 March 1836	Henry Ryder	Translated from Gloucester; died in office.
3 July 1836	24 January 1837	Samuel Butler	Became Bishop of Lichfield when Coventry was transferred to Worcester diocese.
Bishops of Lichfield
From	Until	Incumbent	Notes
24 January 1837	4 December 1839	Samuel Butler	Previously Bishop of Lichfield and Coventry; died in office.
23 January 1840	11 October 1843	James Bowstead	Translated from Sodor & Man.
3 December 1843	19 October 1867	John Lonsdale	Archdeacon of Middlesex and Principal of King's College, London; died in office.
4 January 1868	11 April 1878	George Selwyn	Translated from New Zealand; died in office.
24 June 1878	28 July 1891	William Maclagan	Vicar of St Mary Abbots, Kensington; translated to York.
29 September 1891	15 March 1913	Augustus Legge	Confirmed 28 September 1891; died in office.
13 June 1913	15 June 1937	John Kempthorne	
29 July 1937	11 January 1953	Edward Woods	Died in office.
29 September 1953	1 December 1974	Stretton Reeve	
2 January 1975	29 February 1984	Kenneth Skelton	former Bishop of Matabeleland and Assistant Bishop of Durham; retired.
12 October 1984	2003	Keith Sutton	
2003	30 September 2015	Jonathan Gledhill	
30 September 2015	10 June 2016	Clive Gregory	Bishop of Wolverhampton. Acting bishop.
10 June 2016	incumbent	Michael Ipgrave	

== Assistant bishops ==
Among those called Assistant Bishop of Lichfield, or coadjutor bishop, were:

- 1869–1880: Edmund Hobhouse, former Anglican Bishop of Nelson
- 1870–1878: Charles Abraham, former Bishop of Wellington
- 1882–1891: Charles Bromby, Rector of Montford (until 1887), then Warden of St John's Hospital, Lichfield, and former Bishop of Tasmania
