= Alexander of Canterbury =

English monk of Christ Church, Canterbury

Alexander of Canterbury (fl. 1120) was an English monk of Christ Church, Canterbury. He is known as the author of a work, Dicta Anselmi archiepiscopi, which has been also ascribed to Eadmer. He was employed as a messenger from Countess Matilda to Anselm, and was sent by Anselm to Pope Paschal II for his instruction on various points.
