= Canterbury Cathedral =

- Cathedral and Metropolitical Church of Christ, Canterbury
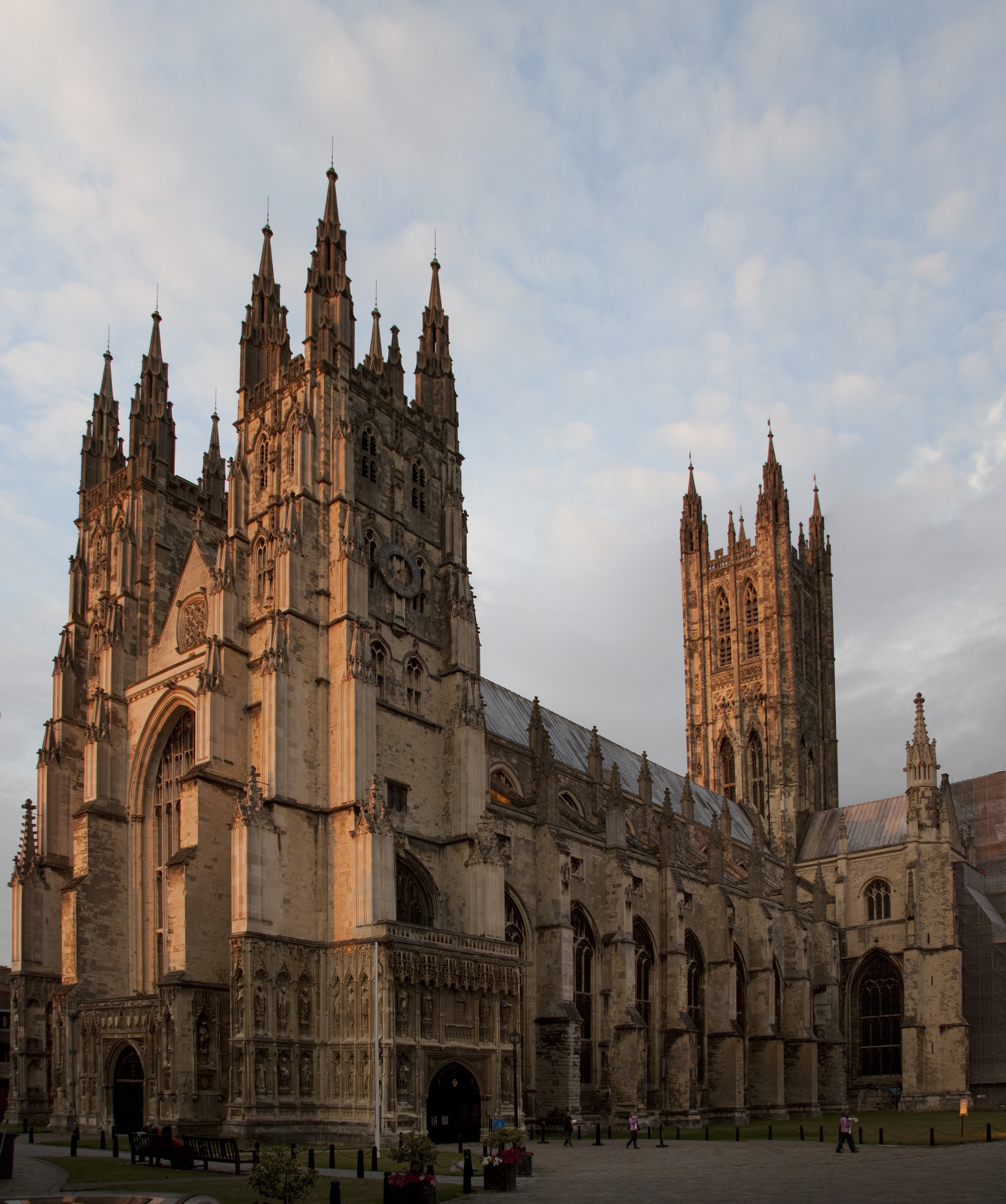
- Cathedral seen from the southwest
- Canterbury Cathedral
- 51°16′47″N 1°04′59″E
- OS grid reference: TR 15084 57922
- Location: Canterbury, Kent
- Country: England
- Denomination: Church of England
- Previous denomination: Roman Catholic
- Churchmanship: Liberal Catholic
- Website: www.canterbury-cathedral.org

History
- Status: Cathedral
- Consecrated: 1070

Architecture
- Functional status: Active
- Heritage designation: Grade I listed
- Designated: 3 December 1949
- Architectural type: Cruciform basilica
- Style: Romanesque, Gothic
- Groundbreaking: 1070
- Completed: 1834 (last major alteration)

Specifications
- Length: 525 ft (160 m)
- Width: 154 ft (47 m)

Administration
- Province: Canterbury
- Diocese: Canterbury

Clergy
- Archbishop: Sarah Mullally, Archbishop of Canterbury
- Bishop(s): Rose Hudson-Wilkin, Bishop of Dover
- Dean: David Monteith

UNESCO World Heritage Site
- Official name: Canterbury Cathedral, St Augustine's Abbey, and St Martin's Church
- Type: Cultural
- Criteria: i, ii, vi
- Designated: 1988 (12th session)
- Reference no.: 496
- Region: Europe and North America

Listed Building – Grade I
- Official name: Christchurch Cathedral, the Cathedral Precincts
- Designated: 13 December 1949
- Reference no.: 1336823

Canterbury Cathedral is the cathedral of the archbishop of Canterbury, the spiritual leader of the Church of England and symbolic leader of the worldwide Anglican Communion. Located in Canterbury, Kent, it is on the site of one of the oldest Christian structures in England and forms part of a World Heritage Site. Its formal title is the Cathedral and Metropolitical Church of Christ, Canterbury. (Note: The word metropolitical refers to the archbishop of Canterbury's role as the metropolitan bishop of the Province of Canterbury in the Church of England.)

The cathedral was founded in 597 but was completely rebuilt between 1070 and 1077. The east end was greatly enlarged at the beginning of the 12th century, and largely rebuilt in the Gothic style following a fire in 1174, with significant eastward extensions to accommodate the flow of pilgrims visiting the shrine of Thomas Becket, the archbishop who was murdered in the cathedral in 1170. The Norman nave and transepts survived until the late 14th century, when they were demolished to make way for the present structures.

Before the English Reformation, the cathedral was part of a Benedictine monastic community known as the Priory of Christ Church, Canterbury, as well as being the seat of the archbishop.

== History ==
=== Roman ===
Christianity in Britain is referred to by Tertullian as early as 208 AD and Origen mentions it in 238 AD. In 314 three Bishops from Britain attended the Council of Arles. Following the end of Roman life in Britain, during the first three decades of the fifth century, and the subsequent arrival of the heathen Anglo-Saxons, Christian life in the east of the island was disrupted. Textual sources however suggest that the Christian communities established in the Roman province survived in Western Britain during the fourth, fifth, and sixth centuries. This Western British Christianity proceeded to develop on its own terms.

=== Anglo-Saxon ===
In 596, Pope Gregory I ordered Augustine, the abbot of St Andrew's Benedictine Abbey in Rome, to lead the Gregorian Mission to convert the Anglo-Saxons to Christianity. According to the writings of the later monk Bede, these Augustinian missionaries gained permission from the Kentish king to restore several pre-existing churches. Augustine then founded Canterbury cathedral in 597 and dedicated it to Jesus Christ, the Holy Saviour. When other dioceses were founded in England, Augustine of Canterbury was made archbishop.

Augustine also founded the Abbey of St Peter and Paul outside the Canterbury city walls. This was later rededicated to St Augustine himself and was for many centuries the burial place of the successive archbishops. The abbey is part of the World Heritage Site of Canterbury, along with the cathedral and the ancient Church of St Martin.

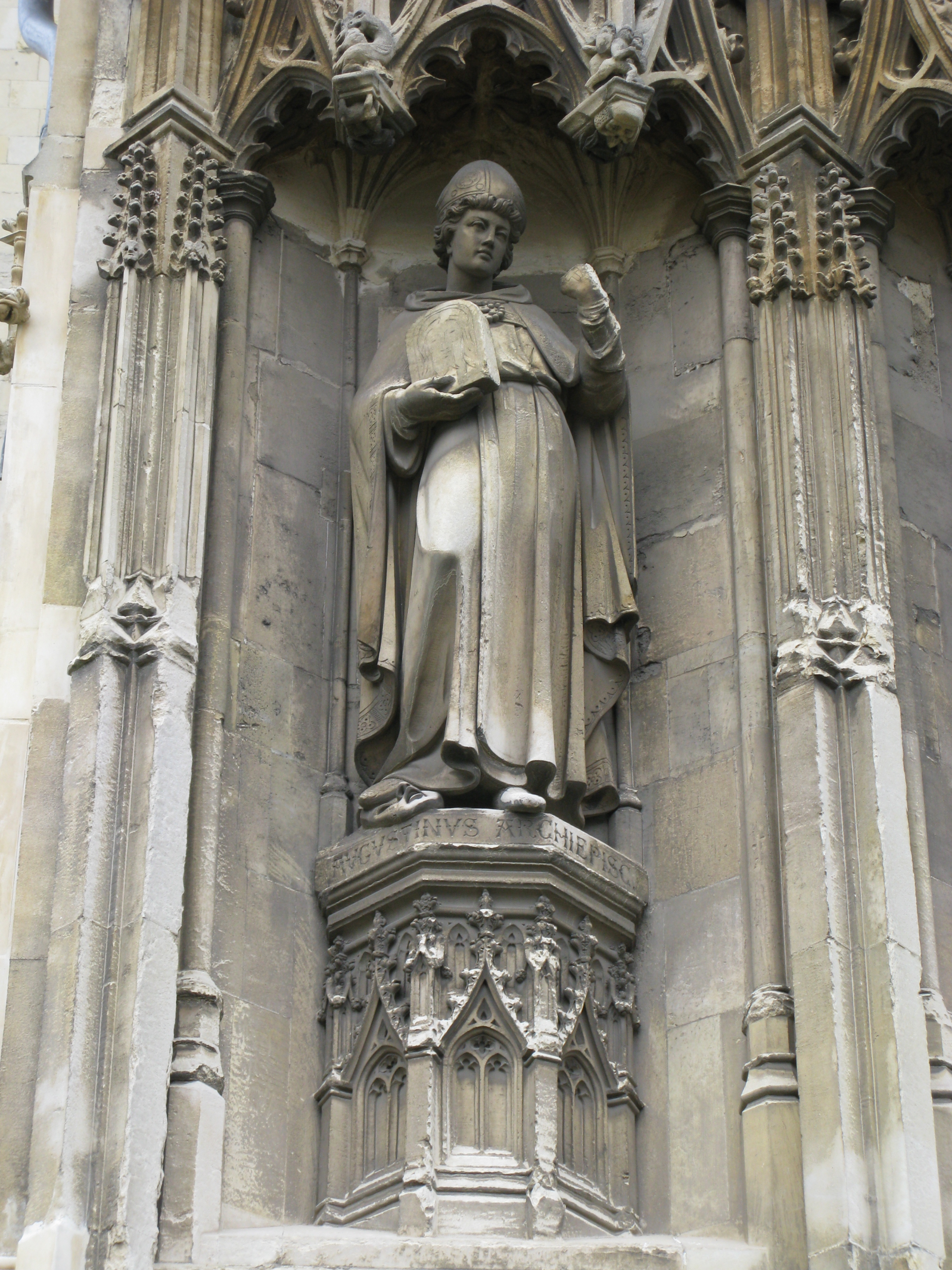
Sculpture of St Augustine, the first Archbishop of Canterbury, on Canterbury Cathedral

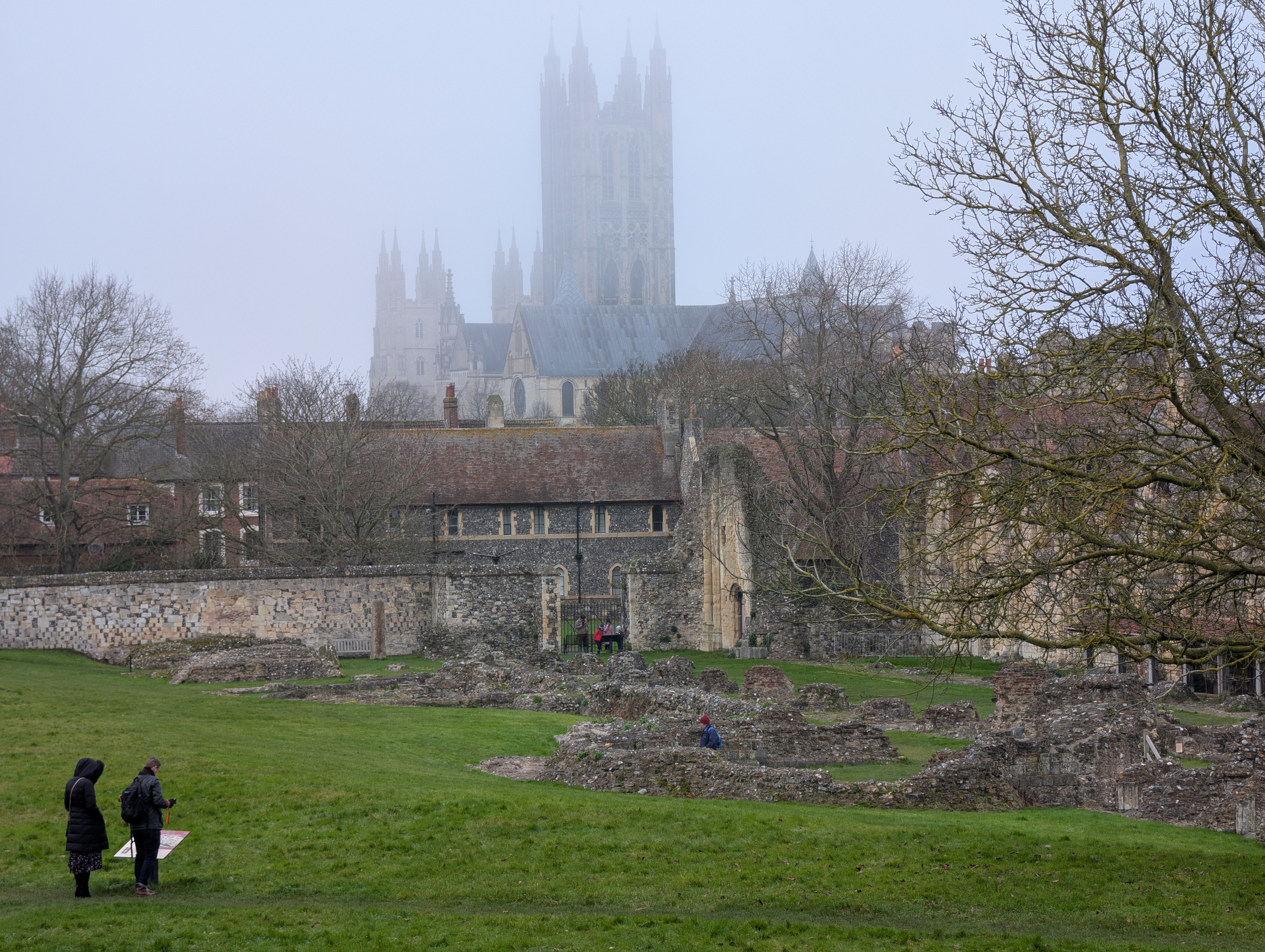
Canterbury Cathedral seen from St Augustine's Abbey in fog — both form part of the World Heritage Site of Canterbury.

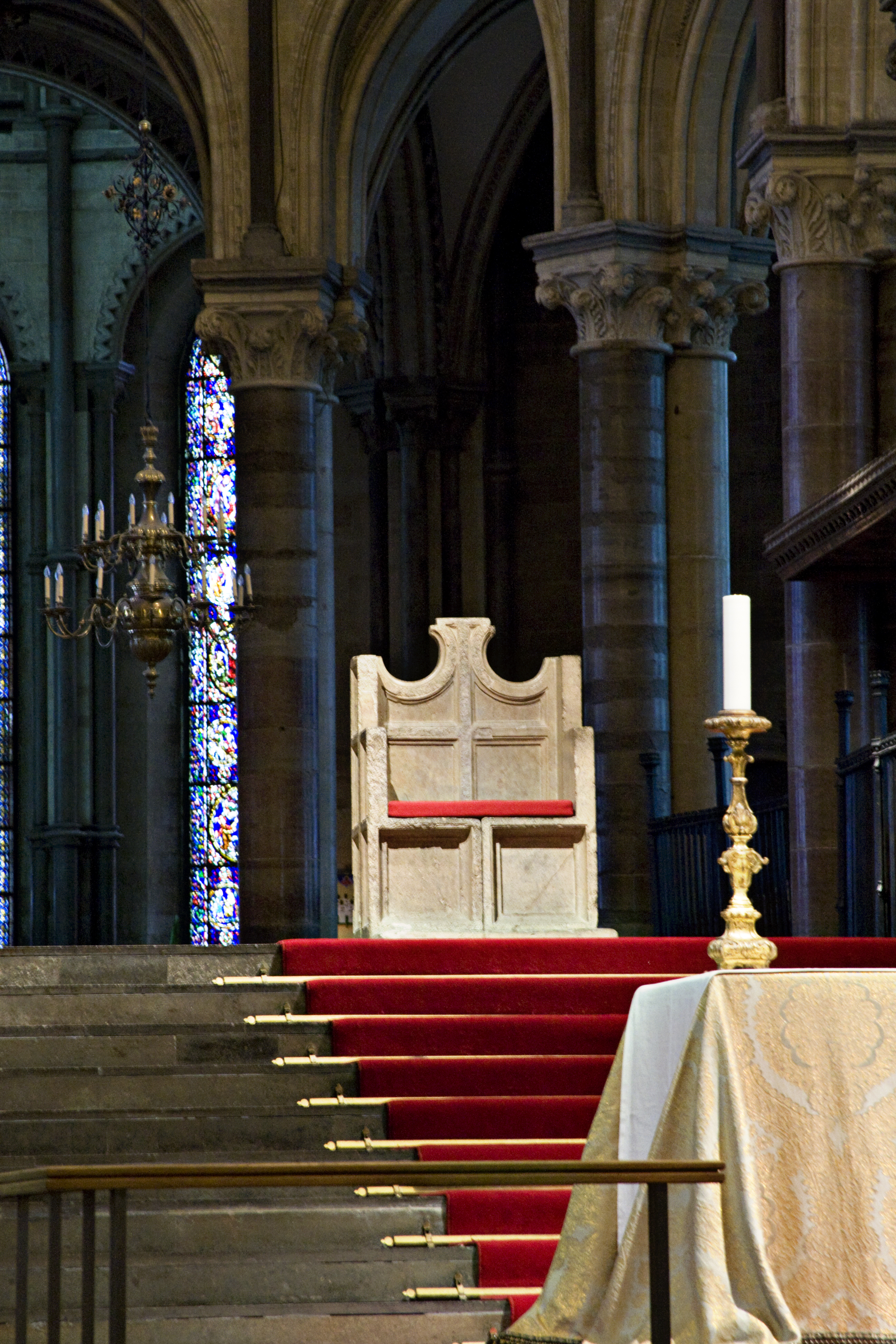
The archiepiscopal throne in Canterbury Cathedral

Bede recorded that Augustine reused a former Roman church. The oldest remains found during excavations beneath the present nave in 1993 were, however, parts of the foundations of an Anglo-Saxon building, which had been constructed across a Roman road. They indicate that the original church consisted of a nave, possibly with a narthex, and side-chapels to the north and south. A smaller subsidiary building was found to the south-west of these foundations. During the 9th or 10th century this church was replaced by a larger structure (161 by 75 ft, 49 by 23 m) with a squared west end. It appears to have had a square central tower. The 11th-century chronicler Eadmer, who had known the Saxon cathedral as a boy, wrote that, in its arrangement, it resembled St Peter's in Rome, indicating that it was of basilican form, with an eastern apse.

During the reforms of Dunstan, archbishop from 960 until his death in 988, a Benedictine abbey named Christ Church Priory was added to the cathedral. But the formal establishment as a monastery seems to date only to c. 997 and the community only became fully monastic from Lanfranc's time onwards (with monastic constitutions addressed by him to Prior Henry). Dunstan was buried on the south side of the high altar.

Anglo-Saxon King Æthelred the Unready and Norman-born Emma of Normandy were married at Canterbury Cathedral in the Spring of 1002, and Emma was consecrated "Queen Ælfgifu".

The cathedral was badly damaged during Danish raids on Canterbury in 1011. The archbishop, Ælfheah, was taken hostage by the raiders and eventually killed at Greenwich on 19 April 1012, the first of Canterbury's five martyred archbishops. (Note: Ælfheah is venerated as St Alphege.) After this a western apse was added as an oratory of Saint Mary, probably during the archbishopric of Lyfing (1013–1020) or Aethelnoth (1020–1038).

The 1993 excavations revealed that the new western apse was polygonal, and flanked by hexagonal towers, forming a westwork. It housed the archbishop's throne, with the altar of St Mary just to the east. At about the same time that the westwork was built, the arcade walls were strengthened and towers added to the eastern corners of the church.

=== Norman ===
The cathedral was destroyed by fire in 1067, a year after the Norman Conquest. Rebuilding began in 1070 under the first Norman archbishop, Lanfranc (1070–1077). He cleared the ruins and reconstructed the cathedral to a design based closely on that of the Abbey of Saint-Étienne in Caen, where he had previously been abbot, using stone brought from France. The new church, its central axis about 5 m south of that of its predecessor, was a cruciform building, with an aisled nave of nine bays, a pair of towers at the west end, aisleless transepts with apsidal chapels, a low crossing tower, and a short quire ending in three apses. It was dedicated in 1077.

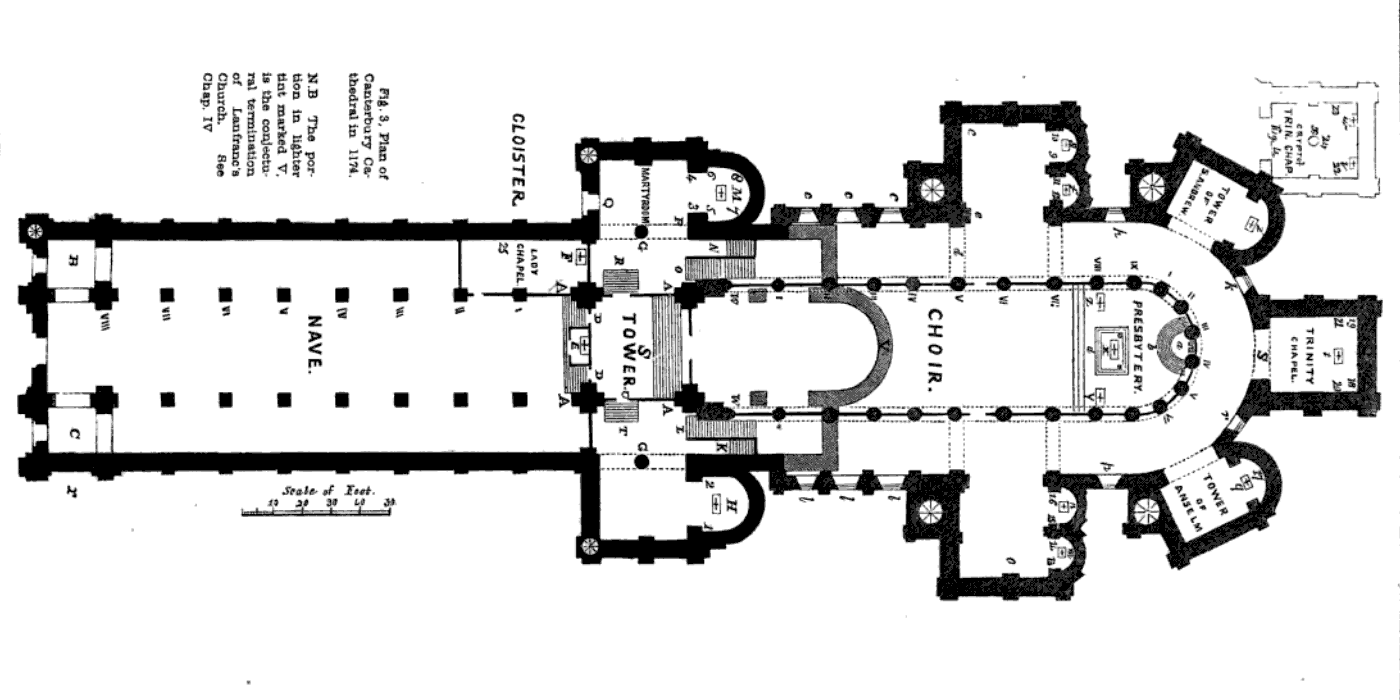
The Norman cathedral, after its expansion by Ernulf and Conrad

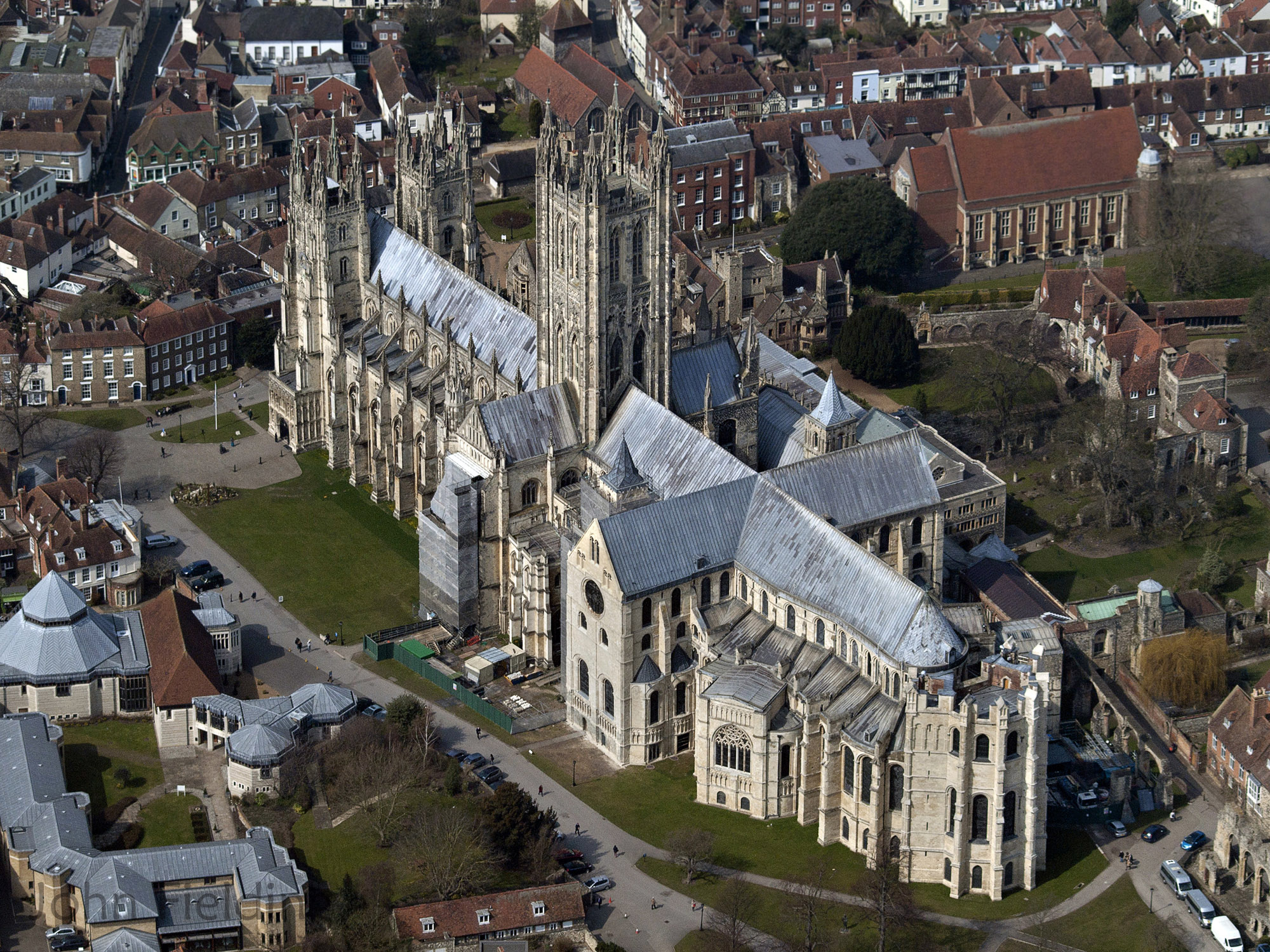
Aerial view of Canterbury Cathedral

Under Lanfranc's successor Anselm, who was twice exiled from England, the responsibility for the rebuilding or improvement of the cathedral's fabric was largely left in the hands of the priors. Following the election of Prior Ernulf in 1096, Lanfranc's inadequate east end was demolished, and replaced with an eastern arm 198 feet long, doubling the length of the cathedral. It was raised above a large and elaborately decorated crypt. Ernulf was succeeded in 1107 by Conrad, who completed the work by 1126. The new quire took the form of a complete church in itself, with its own transepts; the east end was semicircular in plan, with three chapels opening off an ambulatory. A free-standing campanile was built on a mound in the cathedral precinct in about 1160.

As with many Gothic church buildings, the interior of the quire was richly embellished. William of Malmesbury wrote: "Nothing like it could be seen in England either for the light of its glass windows, the gleaming of its marble pavements, or the many-coloured paintings which led the eyes to the panelled ceiling above."

Though named after the 6th-century founding archbishop, the Chair of St Augustine, the ceremonial enthronement chair of the Archbishop of Canterbury, may date from the Norman period. Its first recorded use is in 1205.

=== Plantagenet period ===
==== Martyrdom of Thomas Becket ====
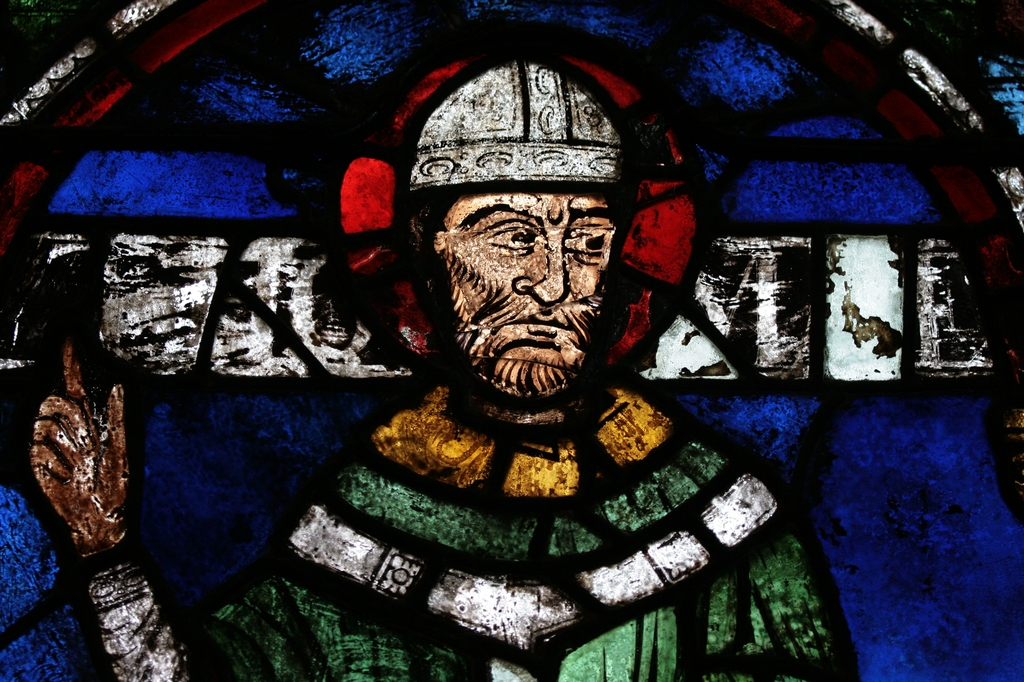
Image of Thomas Becket from a stained glass window

A pivotal moment in the history of the cathedral was the murder of the archbishop, Thomas Becket, in the north-west transept (also known as the Martyrdom) on Tuesday 29 December 1170, by knights of King Henry II. The king had frequent conflicts with the strong-willed Becket and is said to have exclaimed in frustration, "Will no one rid me of this turbulent priest?" Four knights took it literally and murdered Becket in his own cathedral. After the Anglo-Saxon Ælfheah in 1012, Becket was the second Archbishop of Canterbury to be murdered.

The posthumous veneration of Becket transformed the cathedral into a place of pilgrimage, necessitating both expansion of the building and an increase in wealth, via revenues from pilgrims, in order to make expansion possible.

==== Rebuilding of the quire ====
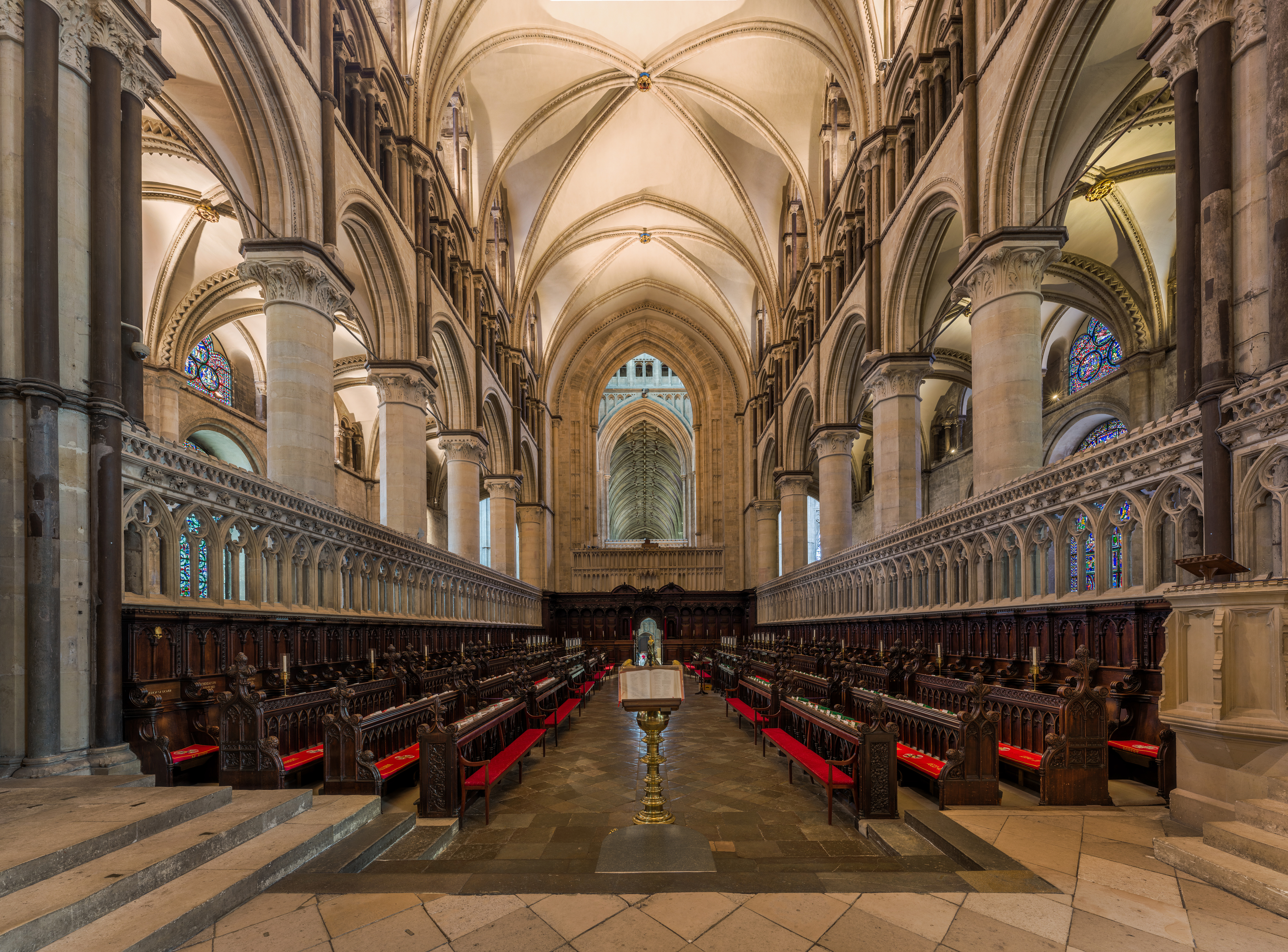
The 12th-century quire

In September 1174 the quire was severely damaged by fire, necessitating a major reconstruction, the progress of which was recorded in detail by a monk named Gervase. The crypt survived the fire intact, and it was found possible to retain the outer walls of the quire, which were increased in height by 12 feet (3.7 m) in the course of the rebuilding, but with the round-headed form of their windows left unchanged. Everything else was replaced in the new Gothic style, with pointed arches, rib vaulting, and flying buttresses. The limestone used was imported from Caen in Normandy, and Purbeck marble was used for the shafting. The quire was back in use by 1180 and in that year the remains of Dunstan and Ælfheah were moved there from the crypt.

The master-mason appointed to rebuild the quire was a Frenchman, William of Sens. Following his injury in a fall from the scaffolding in 1179 he was replaced by one of his former assistants, known as William the Englishman.

==== Trinity Chapel and Shrine of Thomas Becket ====
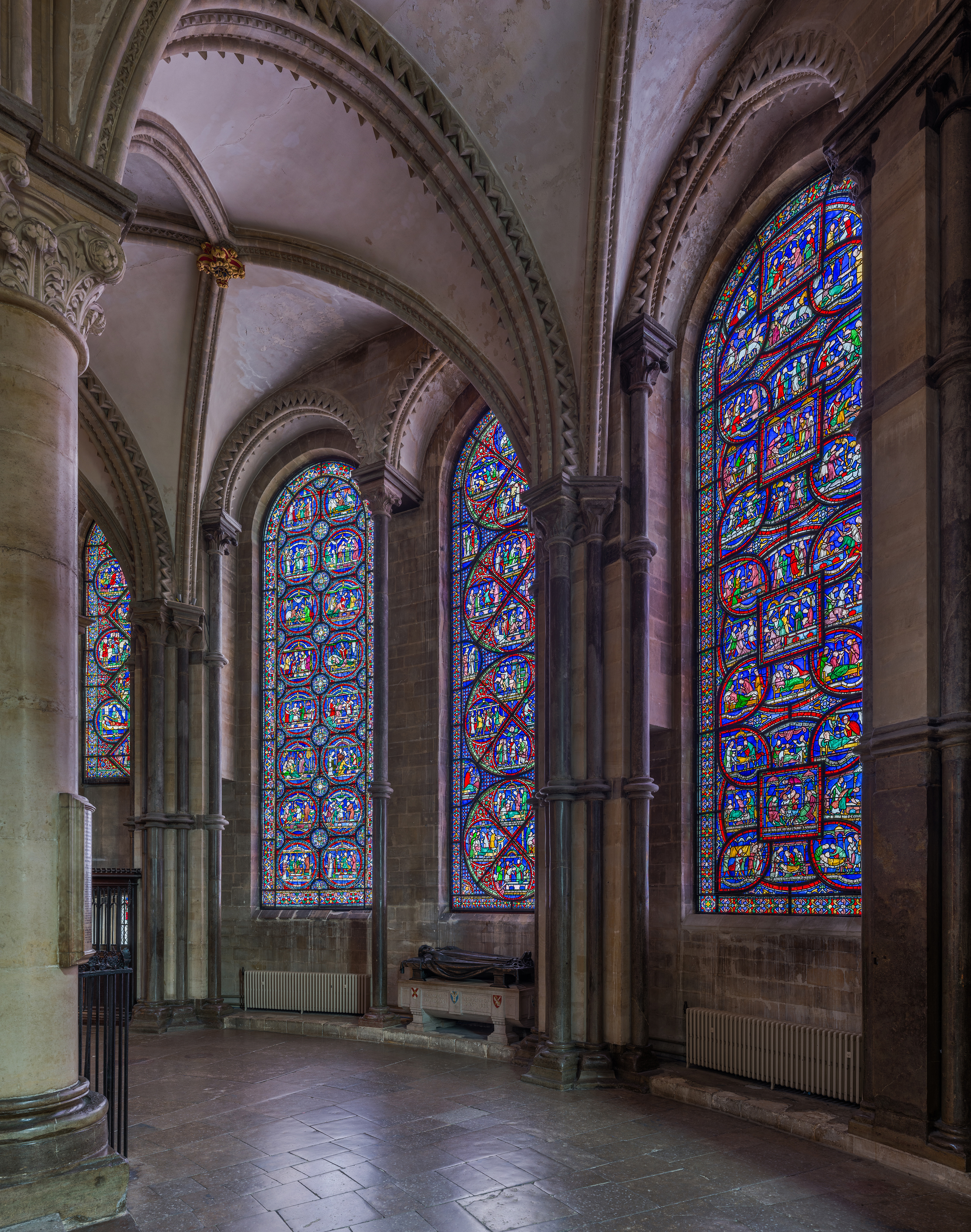
Stained glass in the Trinity Chapel

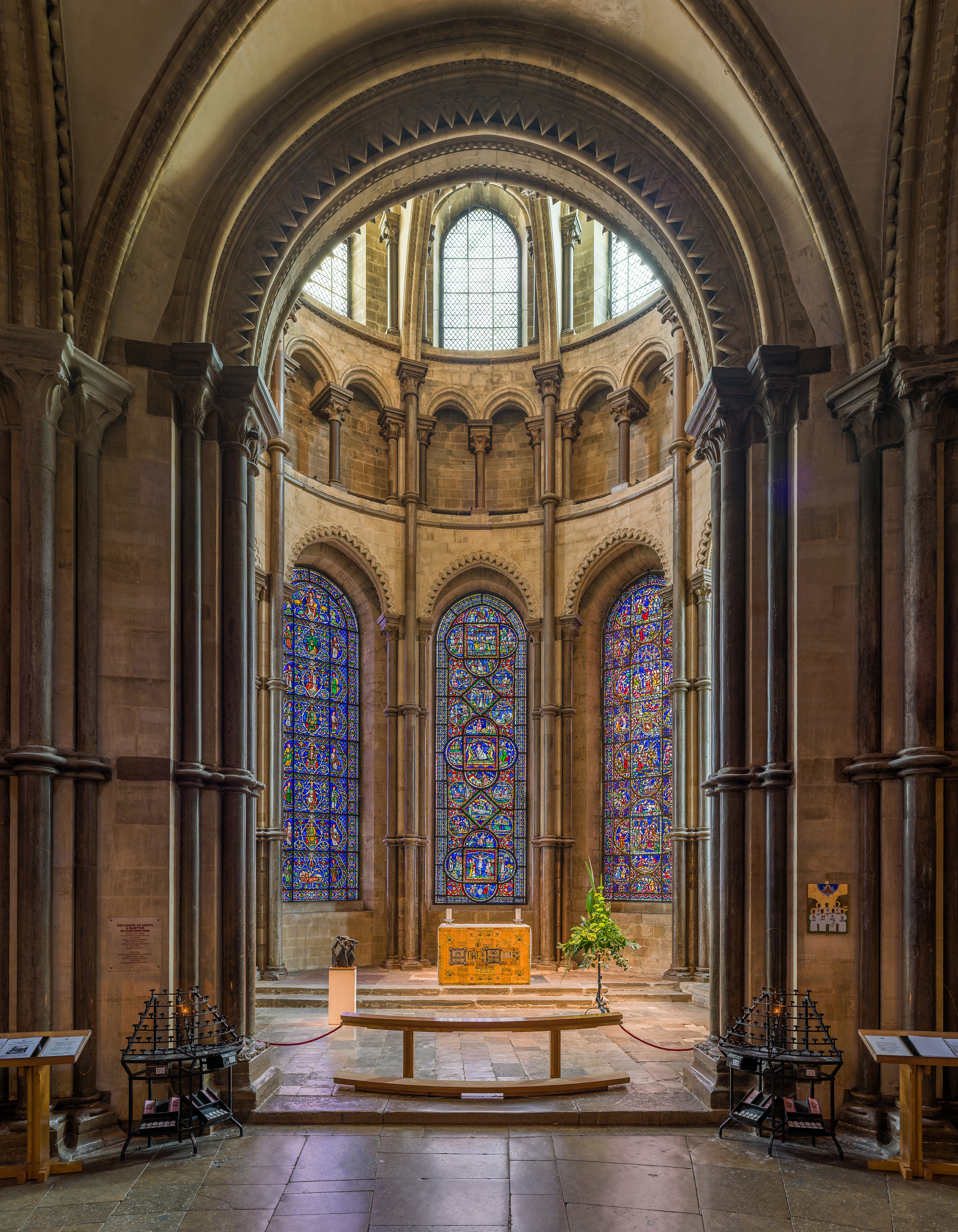
'Becket's crown' chapel at the far east end of the cathedral

In 1180–1184, in place of the old, square-ended, eastern chapel, the present Trinity Chapel was constructed, a broad extension with an ambulatory, designed to house the shrine of St Thomas Becket. A further chapel, circular in plan, was added beyond that, which housed further relics of Becket, widely believed to have included the top of his skull, struck off in the course of his assassination. This latter chapel became known as the "Corona" or "Becket's Crown". These new parts east of the quire transepts were raised on a higher crypt than Ernulf's quire, necessitating flights of steps between the two levels. Work on the chapel was completed in 1184, but Becket's remains were not moved from his tomb in the crypt until 1220. Further significant interments in the Trinity Chapel included those of Edward Plantagenet (The "Black Prince") and King Henry IV.

The shrine in the Trinity Chapel was placed directly above Becket's original tomb in the crypt. A marble plinth, raised on columns, supported what an early visitor, Walter of Coventry, described as "a coffin wonderfully wrought of gold and silver, and marvellously adorned with precious gems". Other accounts make clear that the gold was laid over a wooden chest, which in turn contained an iron-bound box holding Becket's remains. Further votive treasures were added to the adornments of the chest over the years, while others were placed on pedestals or beams nearby, or attached to hanging drapery. For much of the time, the chest (or "feretory") was kept concealed by a wooden cover, which would be theatrically raised by ropes once a crowd of pilgrims had gathered. The Dutch humanist Desiderius Erasmus, who visited in 1512–1514, recorded that, once the cover was raised, "the Prior ... pointed out each jewel, telling its name in French, its value, and the name of its donor; for the principal of them were offerings sent by sovereign princes."

The income from pilgrims (such as those portrayed in Geoffrey Chaucer's Canterbury Tales) who visited Becket's shrine, which was regarded as a place of healing, largely paid for the subsequent rebuilding of the cathedral and its associated buildings. This revenue included the profits from the sale of pilgrim badges depicting Becket, his martyrdom, or his shrine.

The shrine was removed in 1538. King Henry VIII allegedly summoned the dead saint to court to face charges of treason. Having failed to appear, he was found guilty in his absence and the treasures of his shrine were confiscated, carried away in two coffers and 26 carts.

==== Monastic buildings ====
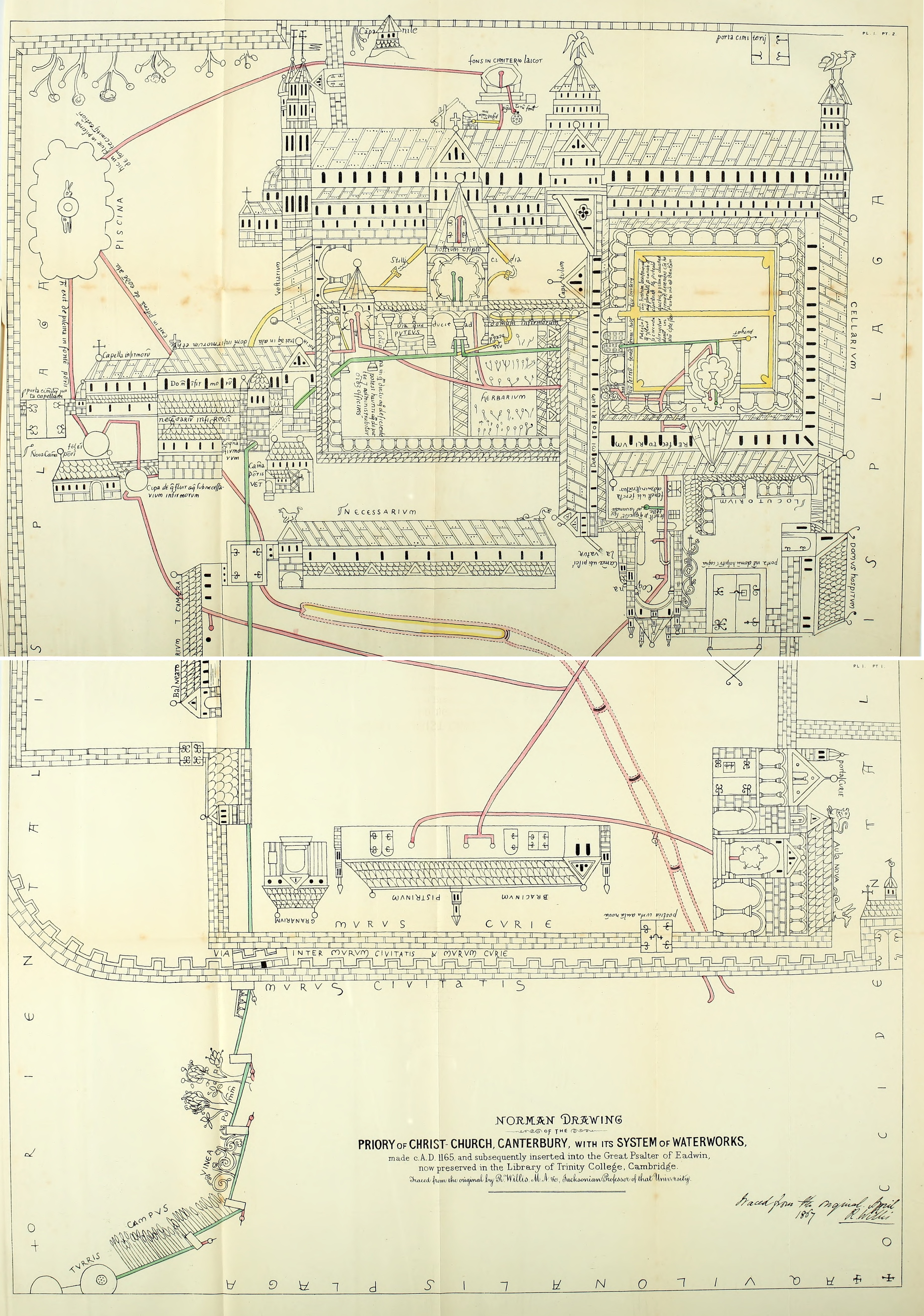
The waterworks plan traced from the original by Robert Willis (1868)

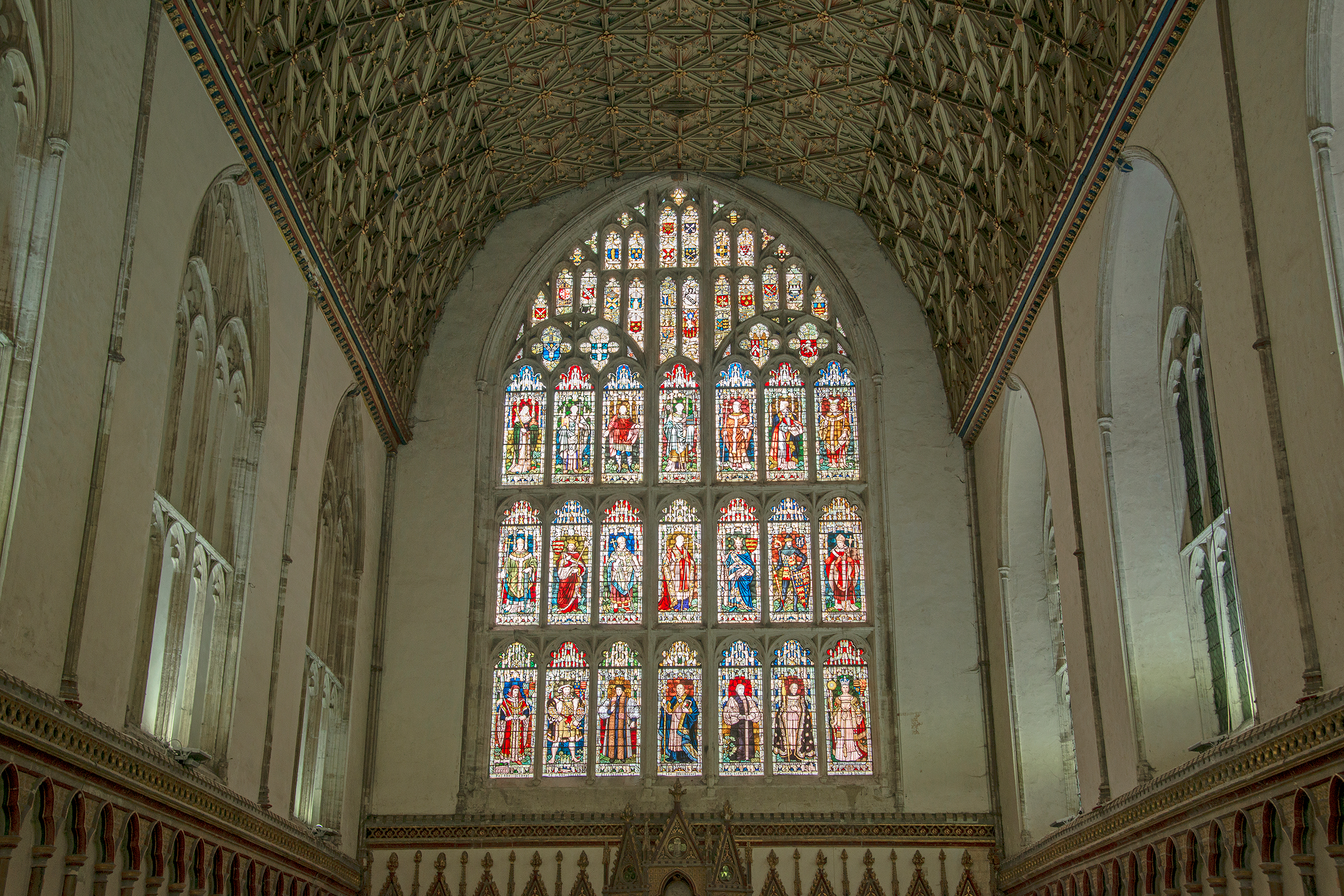
The stained glass windows in the chapter-house

A bird's-eye view of the cathedral and its monastic buildings, made in about 1165 and known as the "waterworks plan" is preserved in the Eadwine Psalter in the library of Trinity College, Cambridge. A detailed description of the plan can be found in the classic paper by Willis. It shows that Canterbury employed the same general principles of arrangement common to all Benedictine monasteries, although, unusually, the cloister and monastic buildings were to the north, rather than the south of the church. There was a separate chapter-house which still exists, said to be "the largest of its kind in all of England". Stained glass here depicts the history of Canterbury.

The buildings formed separate groups around the church. Adjoining it, on the north side, stood the cloister and the buildings devoted to the monastic life. To the east and west of these were those devoted to the exercise of hospitality. Also to the east was the infirmary, with its own chapel. To the north, a large open court divided the monastic buildings from menial ones, such as the stables, granaries, barn, bakehouse, brewhouse, and laundries, inhabited by the lay servants of the establishment. At the greatest possible distance from the church, beyond the precinct of the monastery, was the eleemosynary department. The almonry for the relief of the poor, with a great hall annexed, formed the paupers' hospitium.

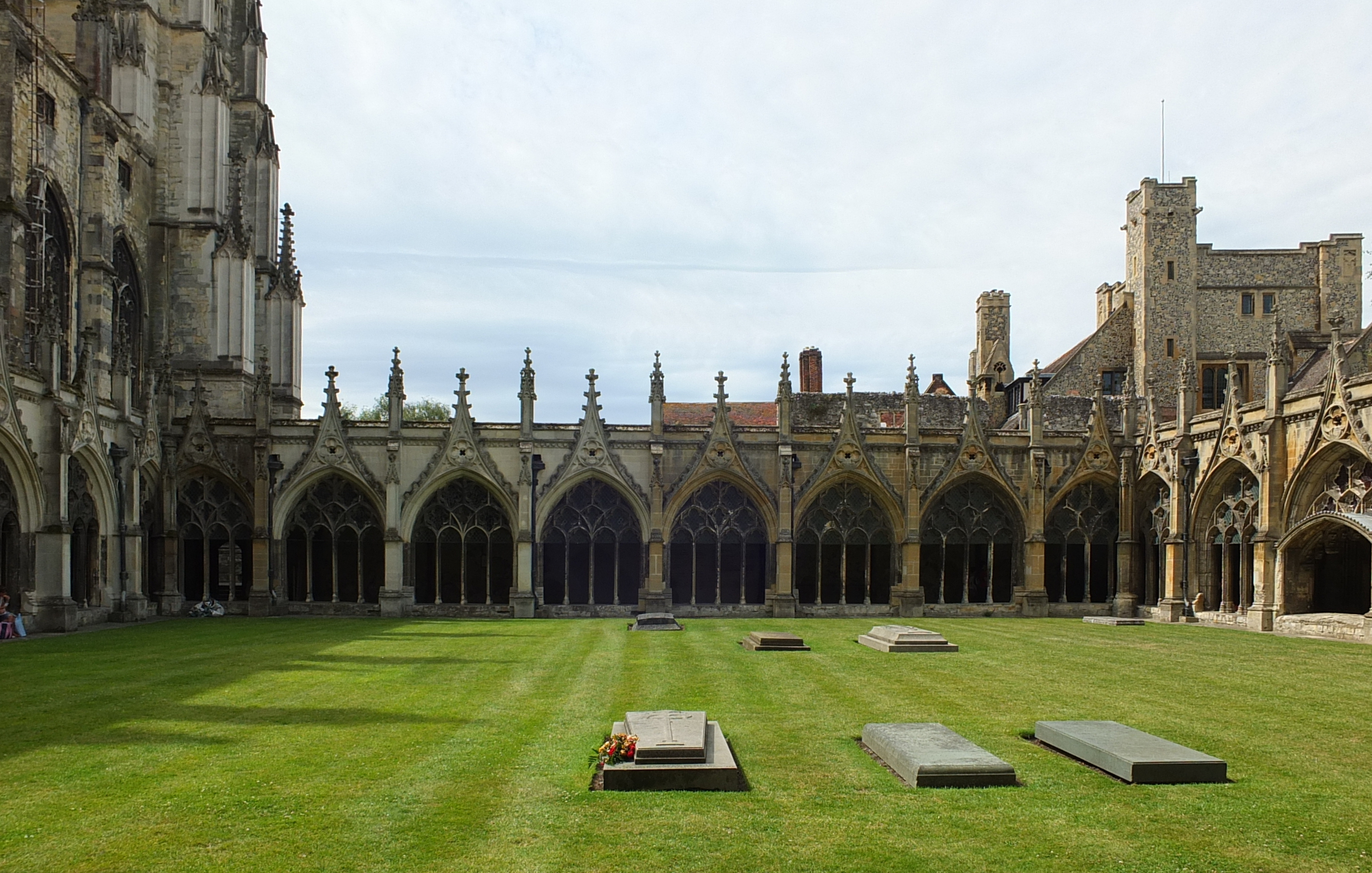
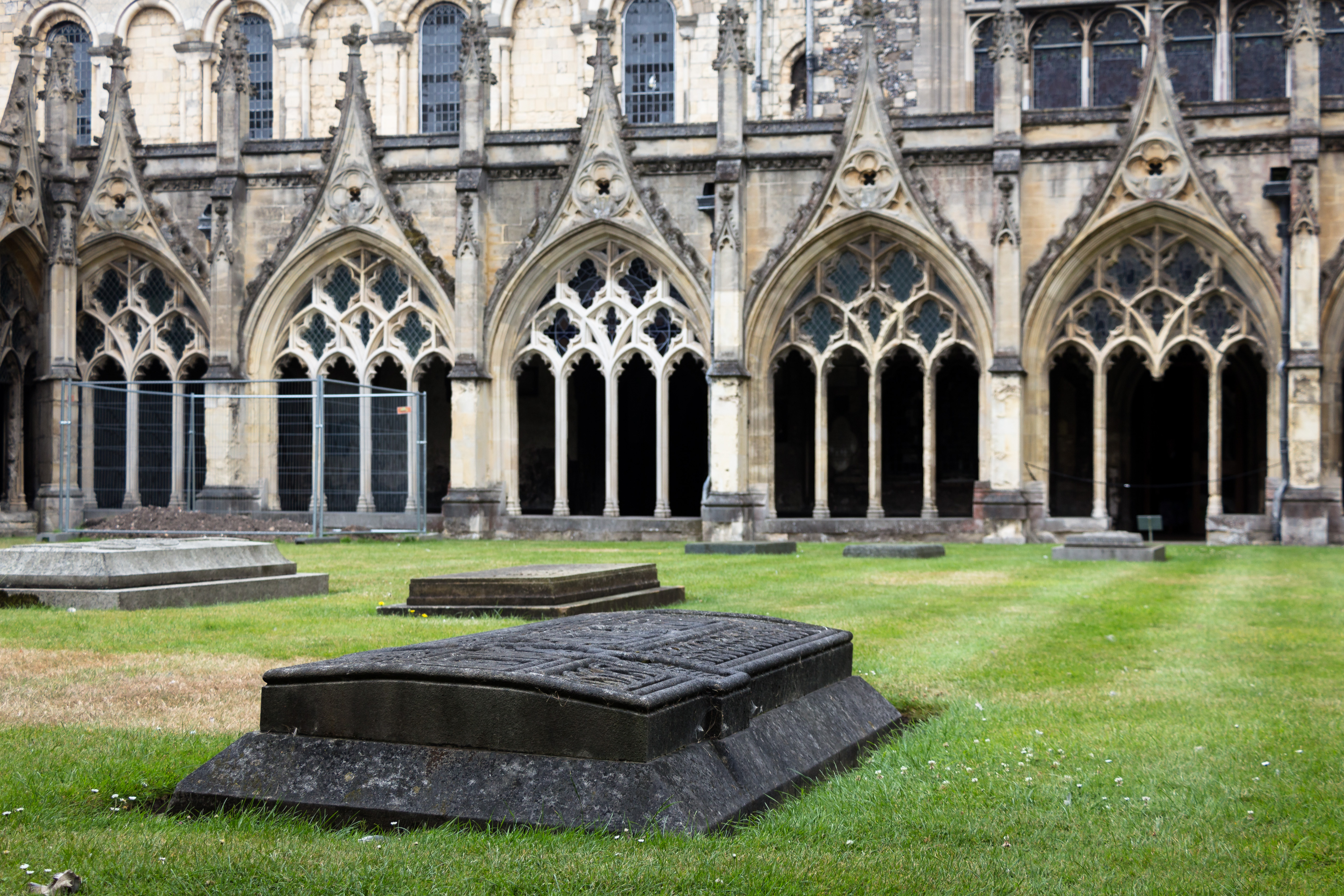
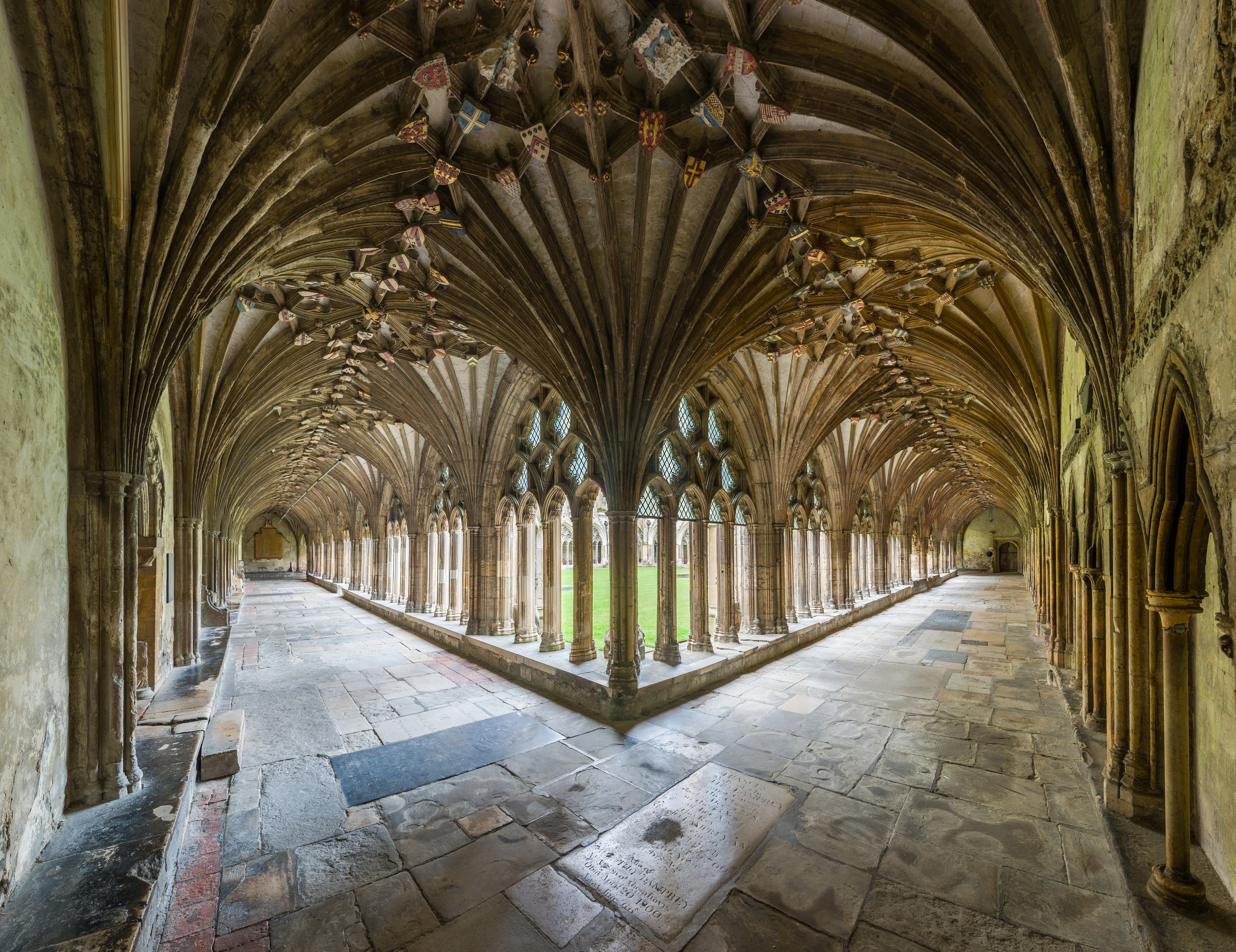
The Great Cloister now holds many relocated ledger stones—moved there after 1787 restorations—while its garth, cleared in the 1930s, retains only six modern grave slabs.

The group of buildings devoted to monastic life included two cloisters. The great cloister was surrounded by the buildings essentially connected with the daily life of the monks: the church to the south, with the refectory placed as always on the side opposite, the dormitory, raised on a vaulted undercroft, and the chapter-house adjacent, and the lodgings of the cellarer, responsible for providing both monks and guests with food, to the west. A passage under the dormitory led eastwards to the smaller or infirmary cloister, appropriated to sick and infirm monks.

The hall and chapel of the infirmary extended east of this cloister, resembling in form and arrangement the nave and chancel of an aisled church. Beneath the dormitory, overlooking the green court or herbarium, lay the "pisalis" or "calefactory", the common room of the monks. At its northeast corner access was given from the dormitory to the necessarium, a building in the form of a Norman hall, 145 feet (44 m) long by 25 feet (7.6 m) broad, containing 55 seats. It was constructed with careful regard to hygiene, with a stream of water running through it from end to end.

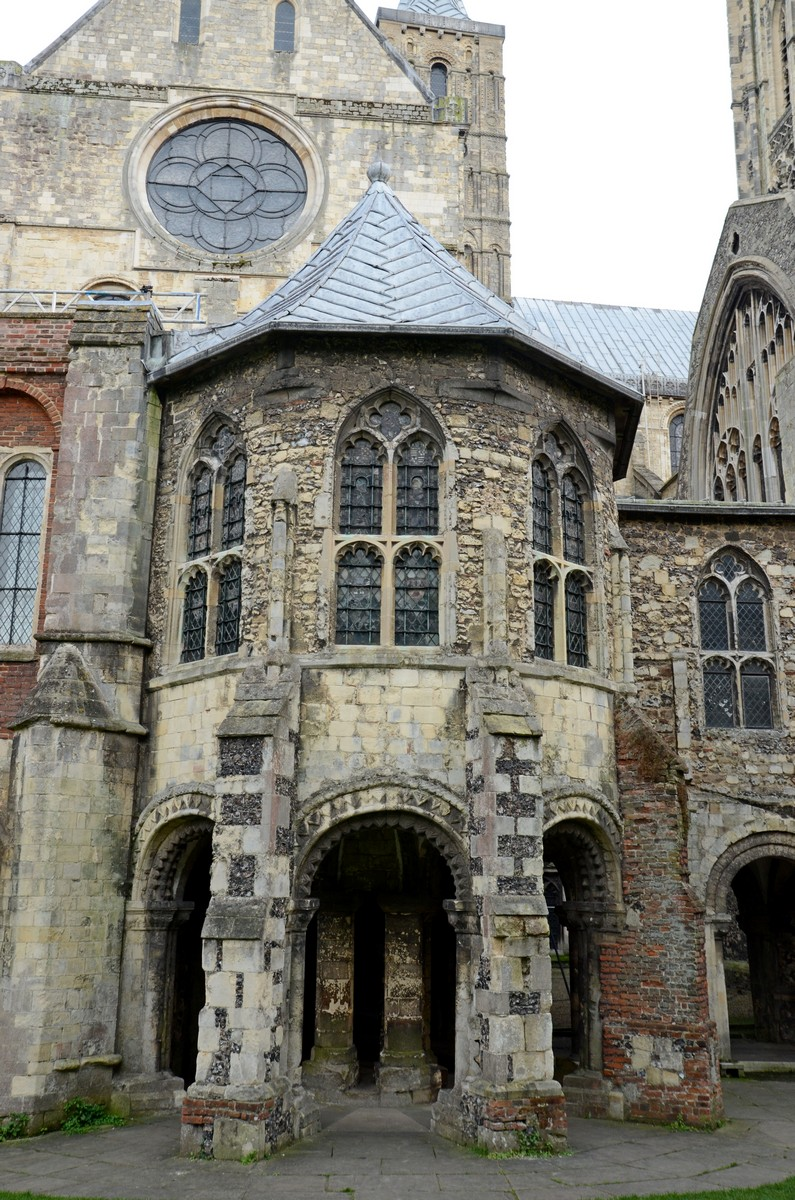
The circular lavatorium tower, for washing hands

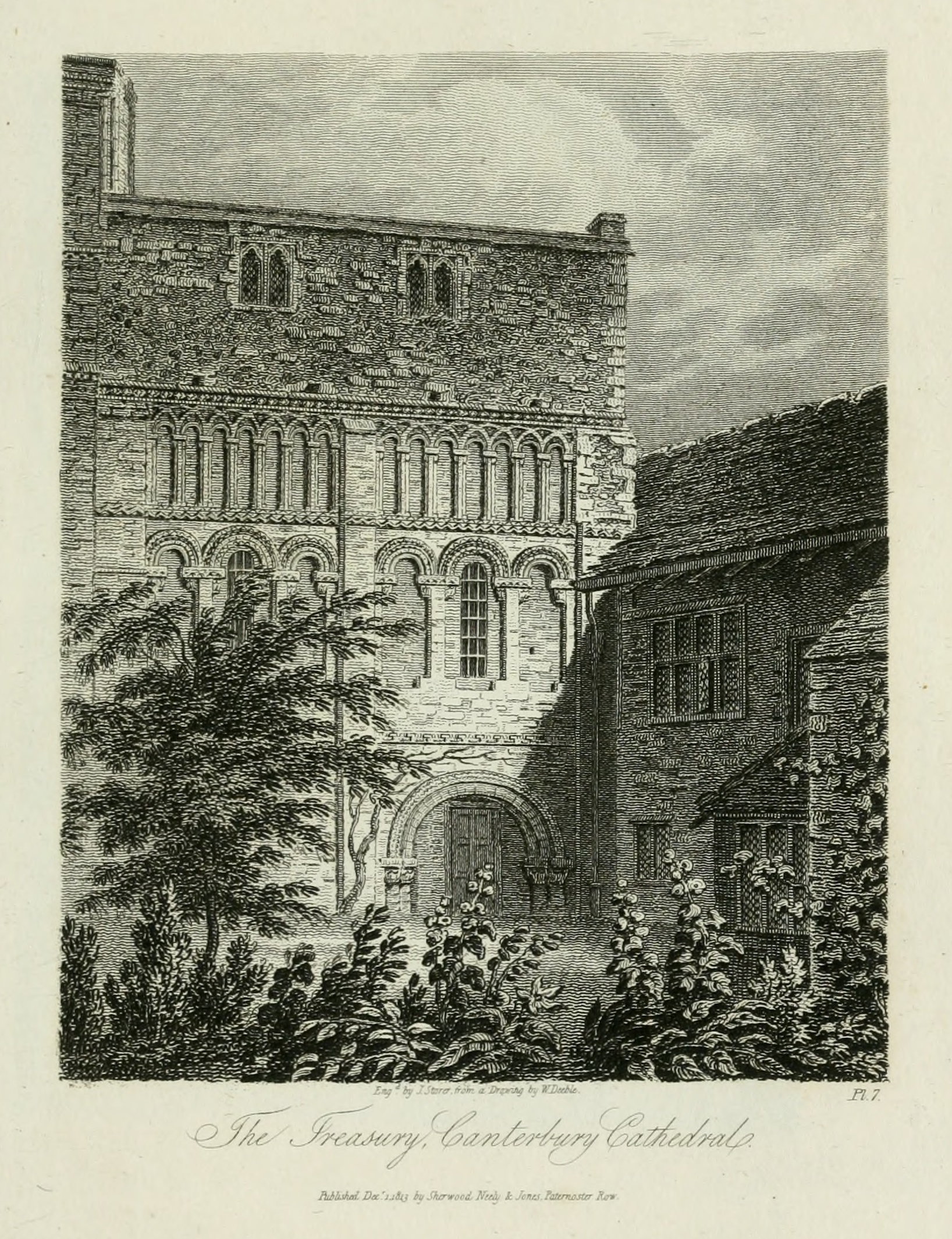
View of the treasury in about 1814

A second smaller dormitory for the conventual officers ran from east to west. Close to the refectory, but outside the cloisters, were the domestic offices connected with it: to the north, the kitchen, 47 feet (14 m) square, with a pyramidal roof, and the kitchen court; to the west, the butteries, pantries, etc. The infirmary had a small kitchen of its own. Opposite the refectory door in the cloister were two buildings where the monks washed before and after eating. One of these is the circular two-storey lavatorium tower. To the south of the infirmary cloister, close to the east end of the cathedral, is the treasury, with a distinctive octapartite vault.

The buildings devoted to hospitality were divided into three groups. The prior's group were "entered at the south-east angle of the green court, placed near the most sacred part of the cathedral, as befitting the distinguished ecclesiastics or nobility who were assigned to him." The cellarer's buildings, where middle-class visitors were entertained, stood near the west end of the nave. The inferior pilgrims and paupers were relegated to the north hall or almonry, just within the gate.

Priors of Christ Church Priory included John of Sittingbourne (elected 1222, previously a monk of the priory) and William Chillenden, (elected 1264, previously monk and treasurer of the priory). The monastery was granted the right to elect their own prior if the seat was vacant by the pope, and – from Gregory IX onwards – the right to a free election (though with the archbishop overseeing their choice). Monks of the priory have included Æthelric I, Æthelric II, Walter d'Eynsham, Reginald fitz Jocelin (admitted as a confrater shortly before his death), Nigel de Longchamps and Ernulf. The monks often put forward candidates for Archbishop of Canterbury, either from among their number or outside, since the archbishop was nominally their abbot, but this could lead to clashes with the king or pope should they put forward a different man – examples are the elections of Baldwin of Forde and Thomas Cobham.

==== 14th and 15th centuries ====
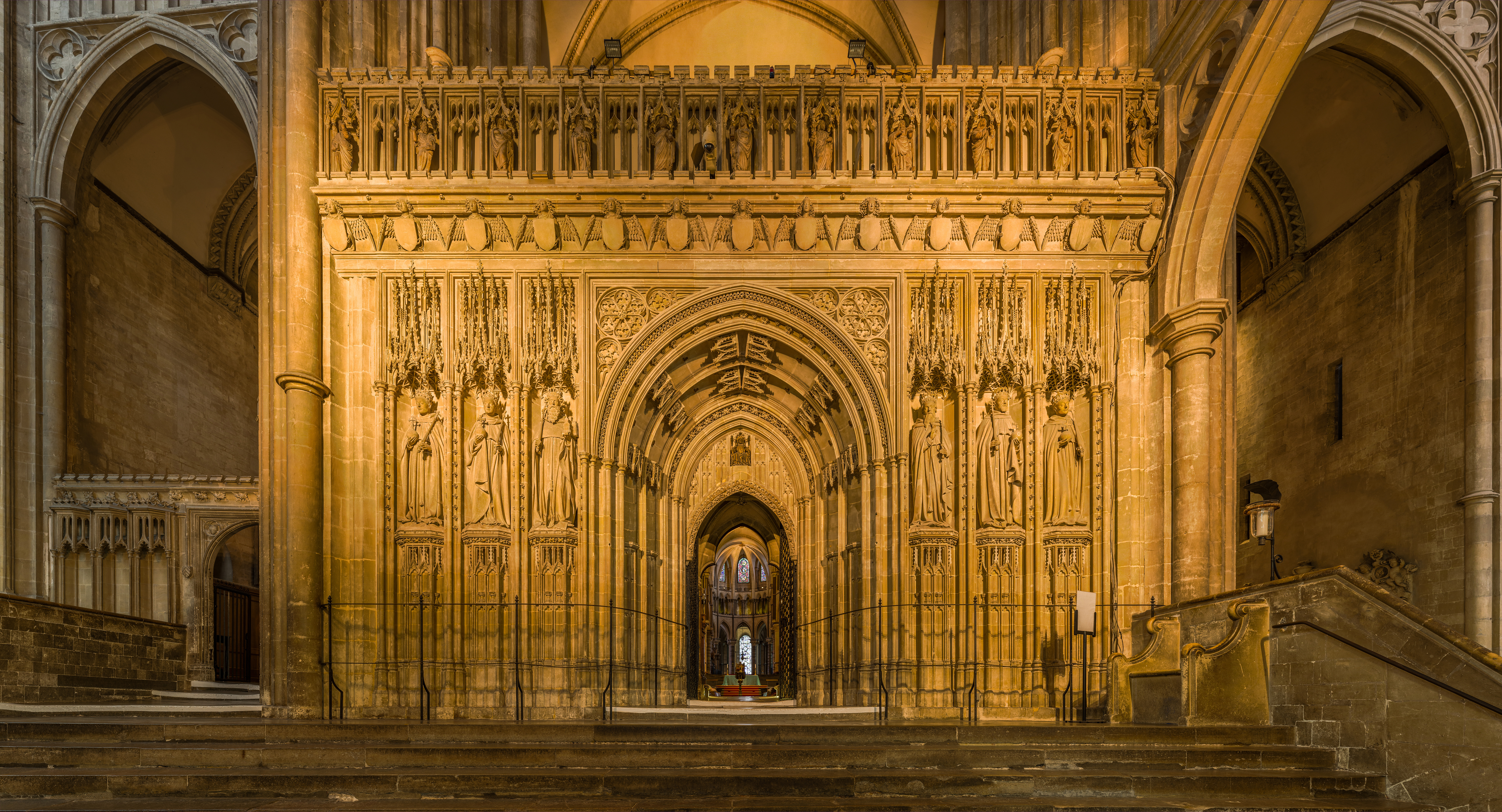
Quire screen

Early in the 14th century, Prior Eastry erected a stone quire screen and rebuilt the chapter house, and his successor, Prior Oxenden inserted a large five-light window into St Anselm's chapel.

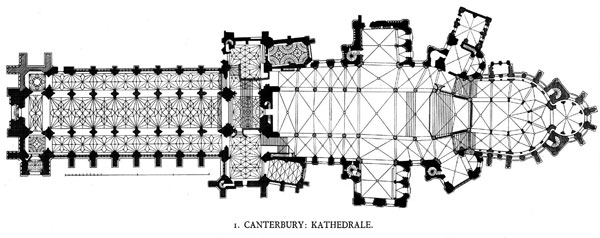
The cathedral was seriously damaged by the 1382 Dover Straits earthquake, losing its bells and campanile.

View from the northwest c. 1890–1900

From the late 14th century the nave and transepts were rebuilt, on the Norman foundations in the Perpendicular style under the direction of the noted master mason Henry Yevele. In contrast to the contemporary rebuilding of the nave at Winchester, where much of the existing fabric was retained and remodeled, the piers were entirely removed, and replaced with less bulky Gothic ones, and the old aisle walls were completely taken down except for a low "plinth" left on the south side. More Norman fabric was retained in the transepts, especially in the east walls, and the old apsidal chapels were not replaced until the mid-15th century. The arches of the new nave arcade were exceptionally high in proportion to the clerestory. The new transepts, aisles, and nave were roofed with lierne vaults, enriched with bosses. Most of the work was done during the priorate of Thomas Chillenden (1391–1411): Chillenden also built a new quire screen at the east end of the nave, into which Eastry's existing screen was incorporated. The Norman stone floor of the nave, however, survived until its replacement in 1786.

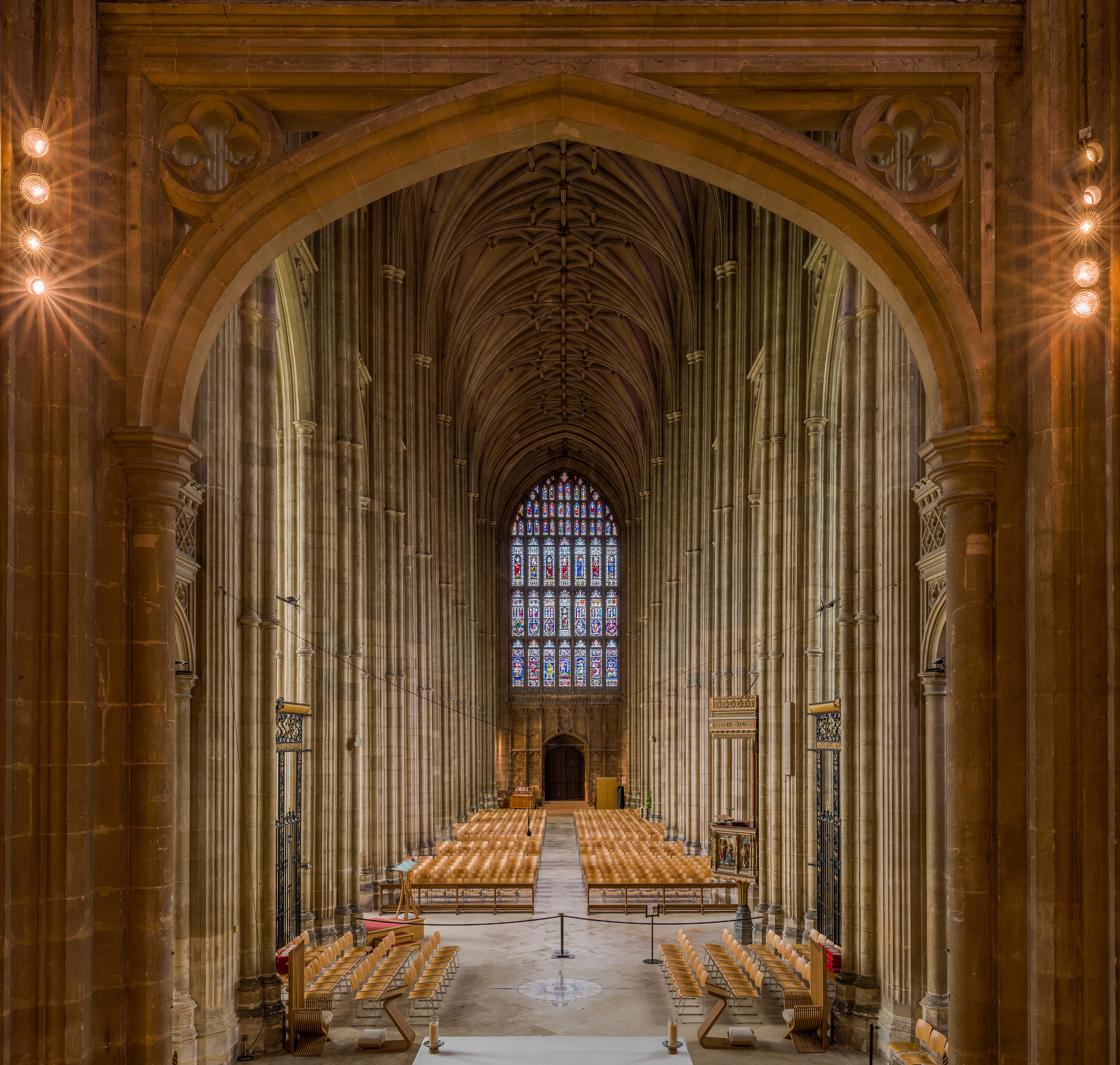
The Perpendicular nave

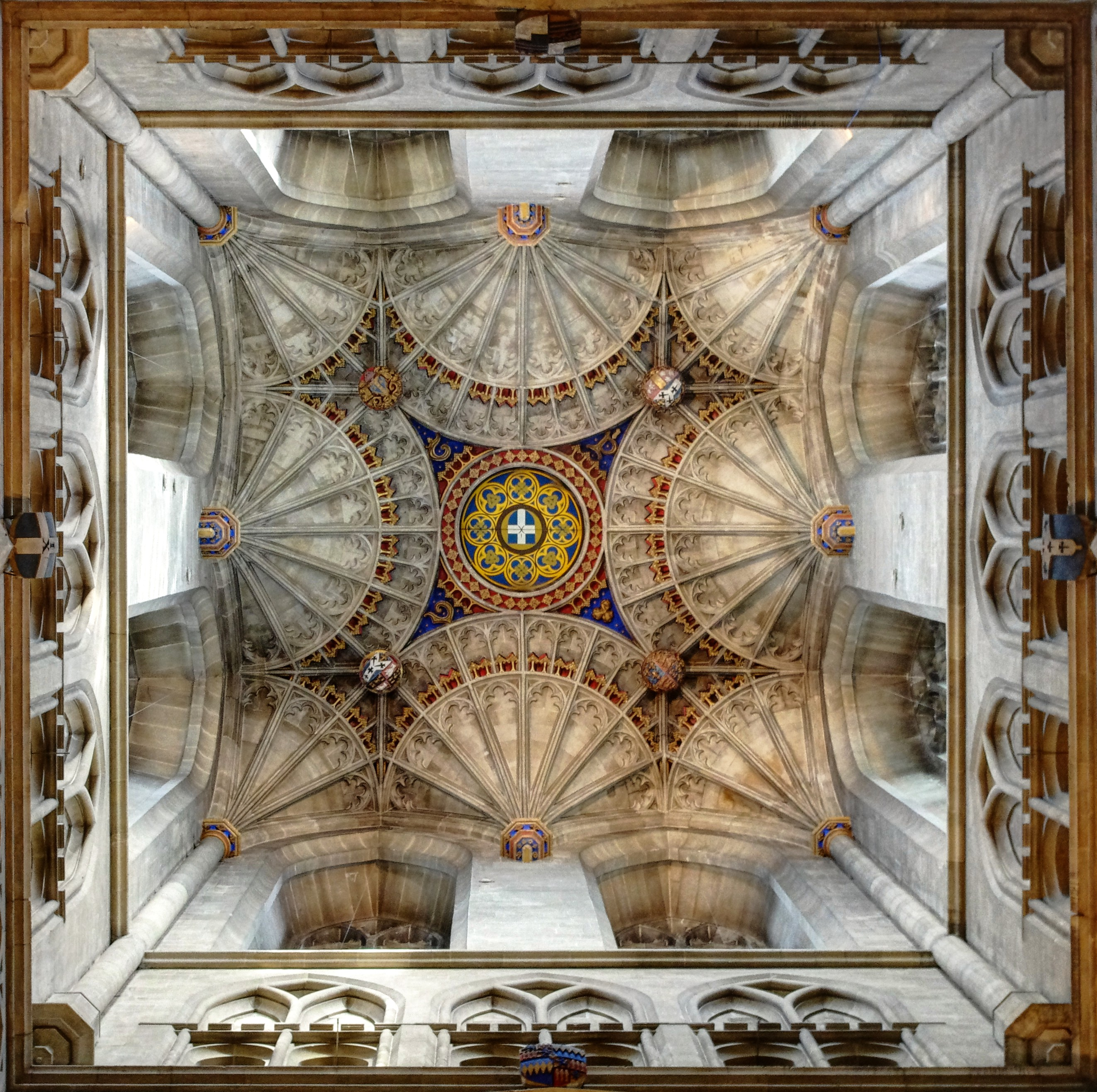
Canterbury Cathedral, fan vaulting of the crossing inside the central Bell Harry Tower

From 1396 the cloisters were repaired and remodelled by Yevele's pupil Stephen Lote who added the lierne vaulting. It was during this period that the wagon-vaulting of the chapter house was created.

A shortage of money and the priority given to the rebuilding of the cloisters and chapterhouse meant that the rebuilding of the west towers was neglected. The south-west tower was not replaced until 1458, and the Norman north-west tower survived until 1834 when it was replaced by a replica of its Perpendicular companion.

In about 1430 the south transept apse was removed to make way for a chapel, founded by Lady Margaret Holland and dedicated to St Michael and All Angels. The north transept apse was replaced by a Lady Chapel, built-in 1448–1455.

The 235-foot (72 m) crossing tower was begun in 1433, although preparations had already been made during Chillenden's priorate when the piers had been reinforced. Further strengthening was found necessary around the beginning of the 16th century when buttressing arches were added under the southern and western tower arches. The tower is often known as the "Angel Steeple", after a gilded angel that once stood on one of its pinnacles.

=== The Modern period ===
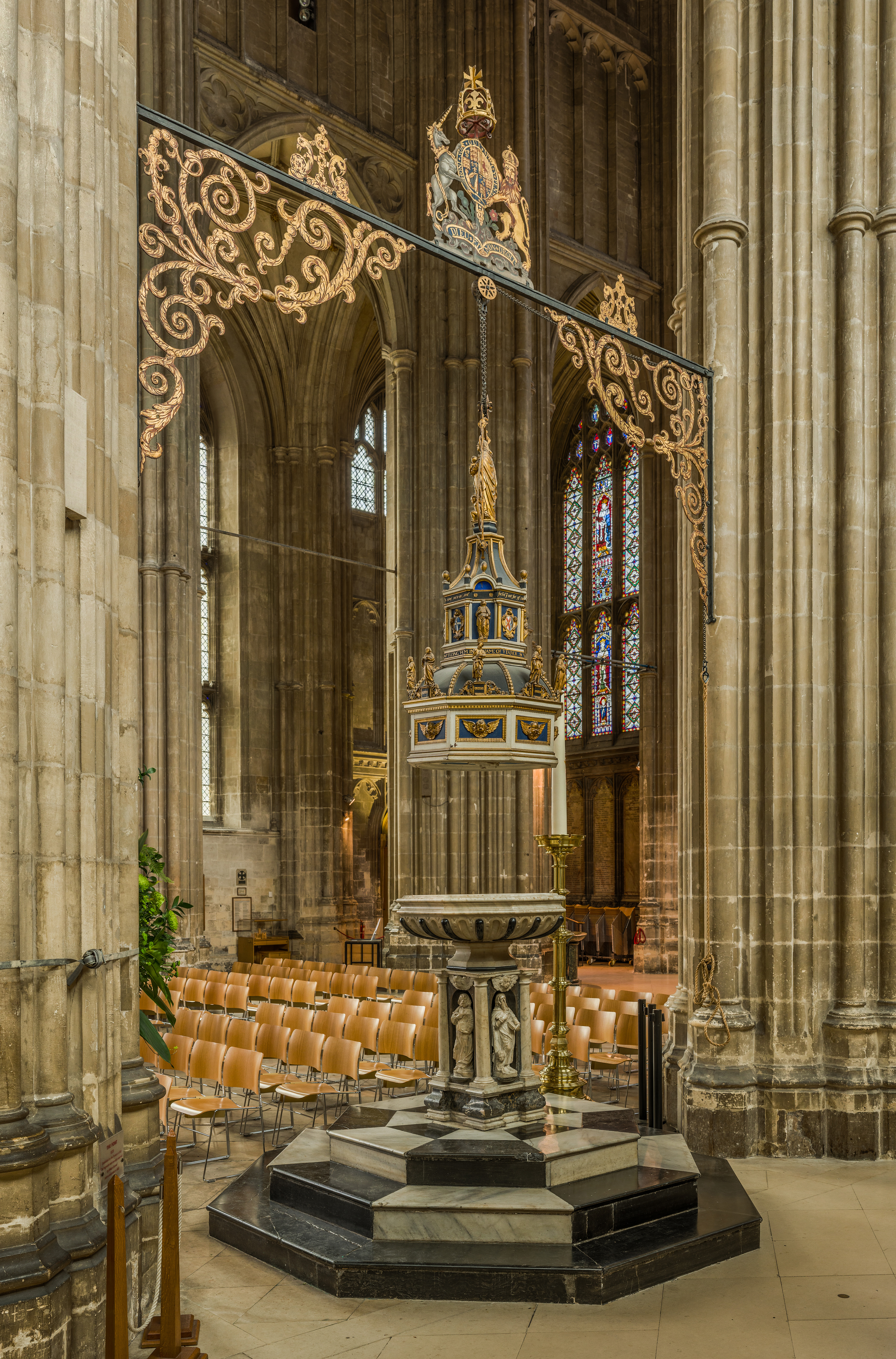
The decorative font in the nave

==== The Reformation, Dissolution and Puritanism ====
The cathedral ceased to be an abbey during the Dissolution of the Monasteries when all religious houses were suppressed. Canterbury Cathedral, and the great monastery of Christ Church were surrendered to the Crown on 30 March 1539, after the occupants had made "an inventory of the good, chattels, plate, precious ornaments, lead, and money belonging to the monks" and "all that could be moved" was "handed over to the master of the jewel-house" of the Tower of London, after which "the Prior and monks were then ejected. The Cathedral reverted to its previous status of 'a college of secular canons'. According to the cathedral's own website, it had been a Benedictine monastery since the 900s. The New Foundation came into being on 8 April 1541. The shrine to St Thomas Becket was destroyed on the orders of Henry VIII and the relics lost.

In around 1576, the crypt of the cathedral was granted to the Huguenot congregation of Canterbury to be used as their Church of the Crypt.

In 1642–1643, during the English Civil War, Puritan iconoclasts led by Edwin Sandys (Parliamentarian) caused significant damage during their "cleansing" of the cathedral. Included in that campaign was the destruction of the statue of Christ in the Christ Church Gate and the demolition of the wooden gates by a group led by Richard Culmer. The statue would not be replaced until 1990 but the gates were restored in 1660 and a great deal of other repair work started at that time; that would continue until 1704.

==== Furnishings ====
In 1688, the joiner Roger Davis, citizen of London, removed the 13th-century misericords and replaced them with two rows of his own work on each side of the quire. Some of Davis's misericords have a distinctly medieval flavour and he may have copied some of the original designs. When Sir George Gilbert Scott carried out renovations in the 19th century, he replaced the front row of Davis' misericords, with new ones of his own design, which seem to include many copies of those at Gloucester Cathedral, Worcester Cathedral and New College, Oxford.

==== Statues on the West Front ====
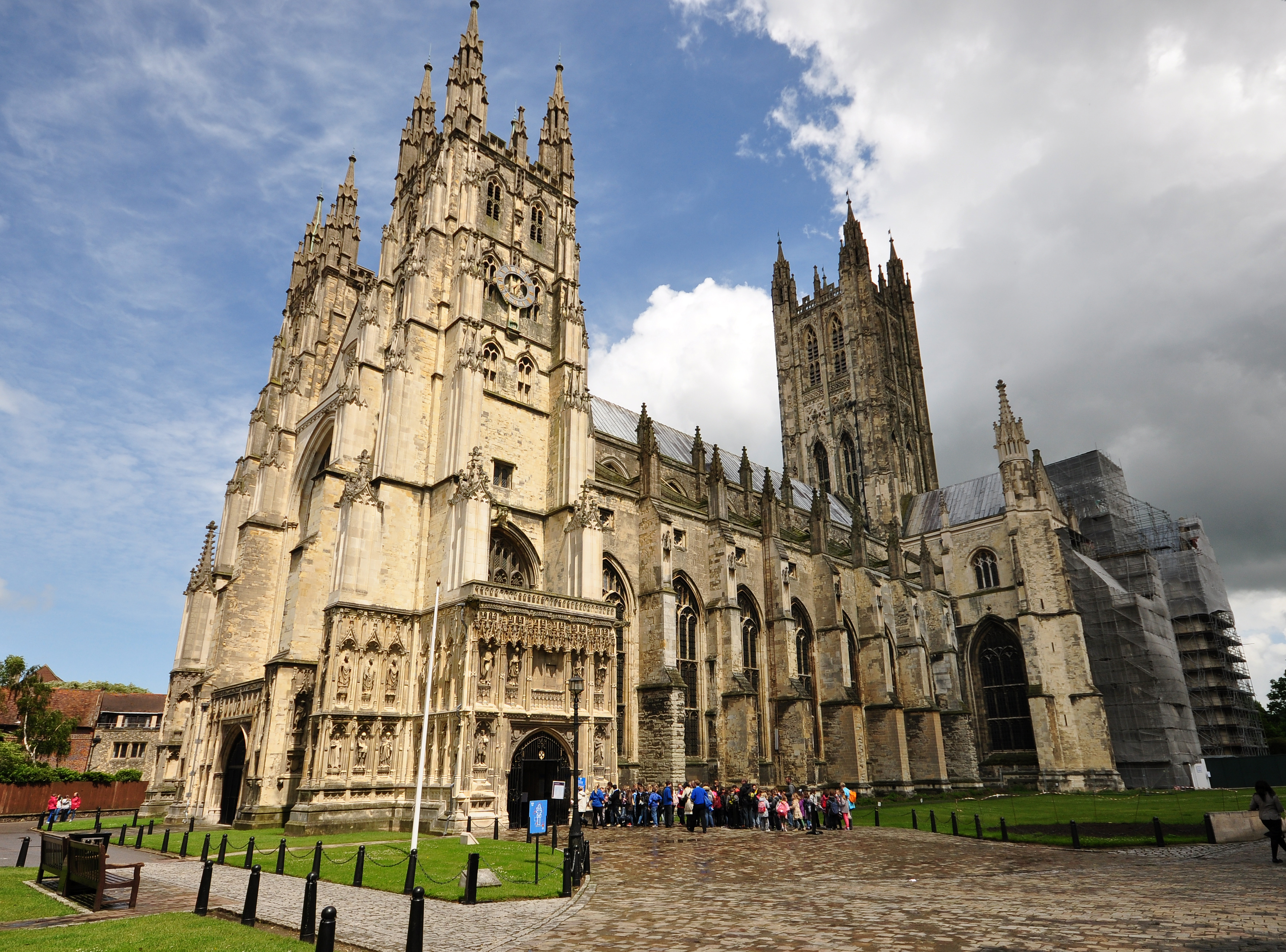

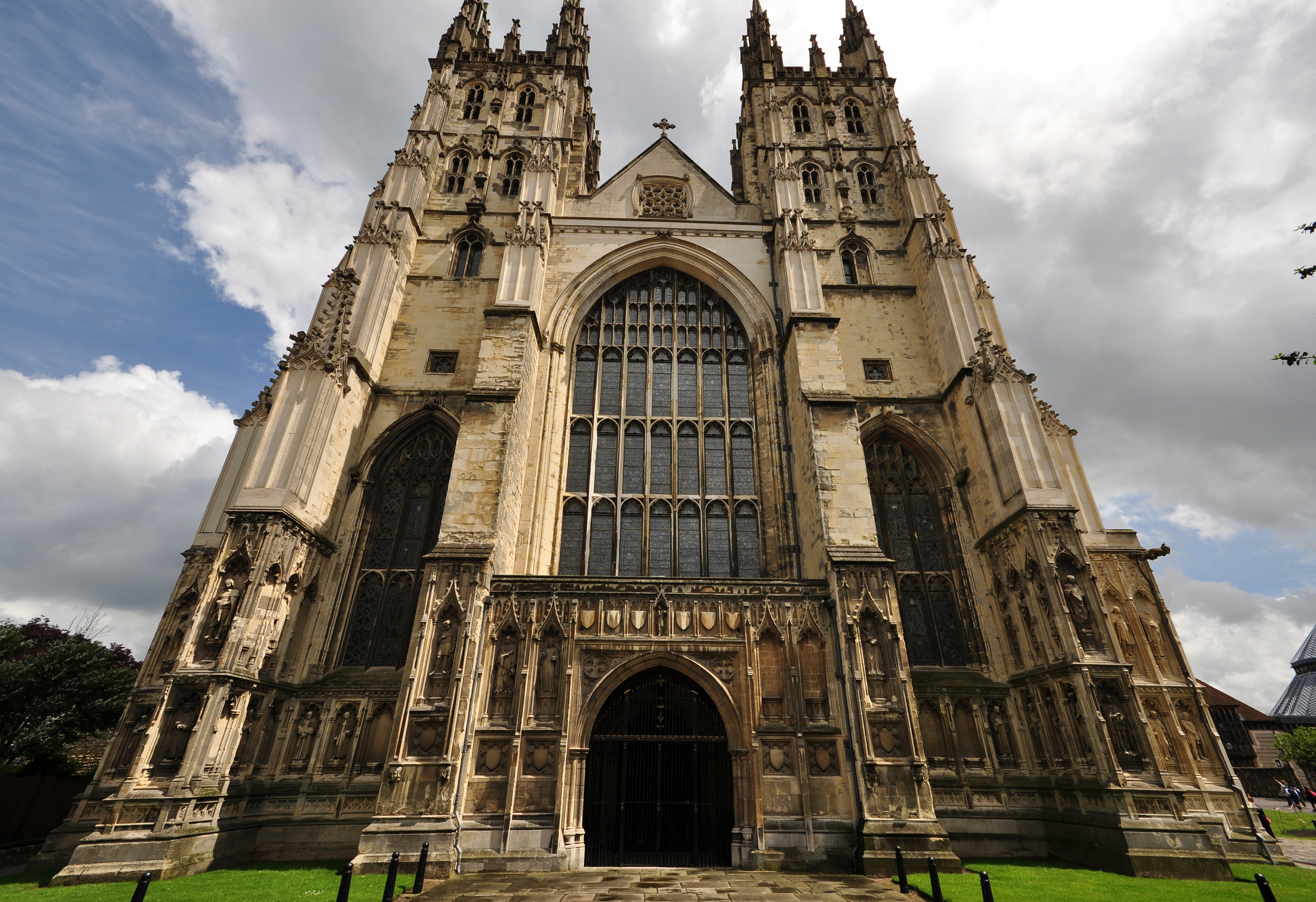

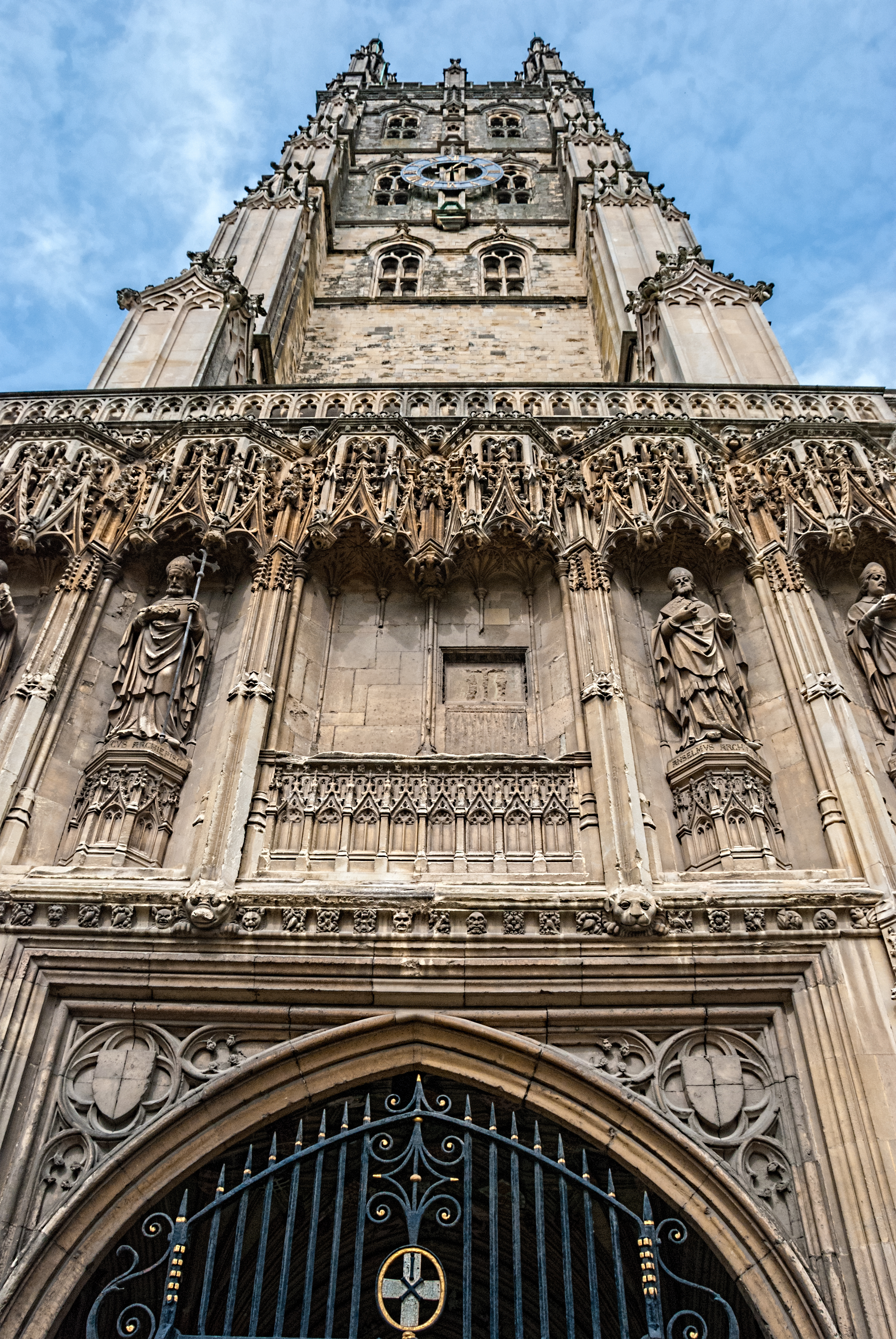

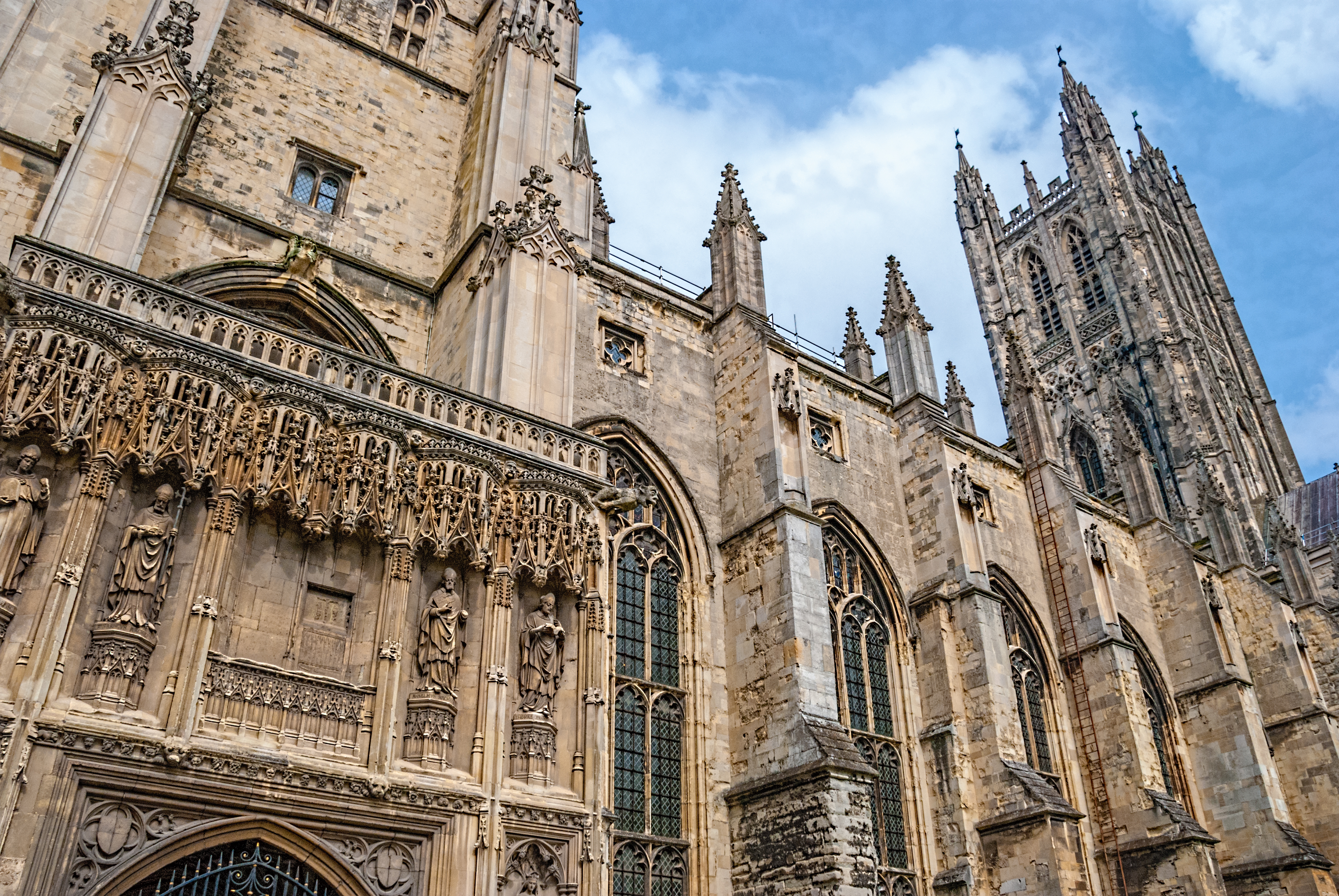

Most of the statues that currently adorn the west front of the cathedral were installed in the 1860s when the South Porch was being renovated. At that time, the niches were vacant and the Dean of the cathedral thought that the appearance of the cathedral would be improved if they were filled. The Victorian sculptor Theodore Pfyffers was commissioned to create the statues and most of them were installed by the end of the 1860s. There are currently 53 statues representing various figures who have been influential in the life of the cathedral and the English church such as clergy, members of the royal family, saints, and theologians. Archbishops of Canterbury from Augustine of Canterbury and Lanfranc, to Thomas Cranmer and William Laud are represented. Kings and Queens from Æthelberht and Bertha of Kent, to Victoria and Elizabeth II are included.

==== 18th century to the present ====
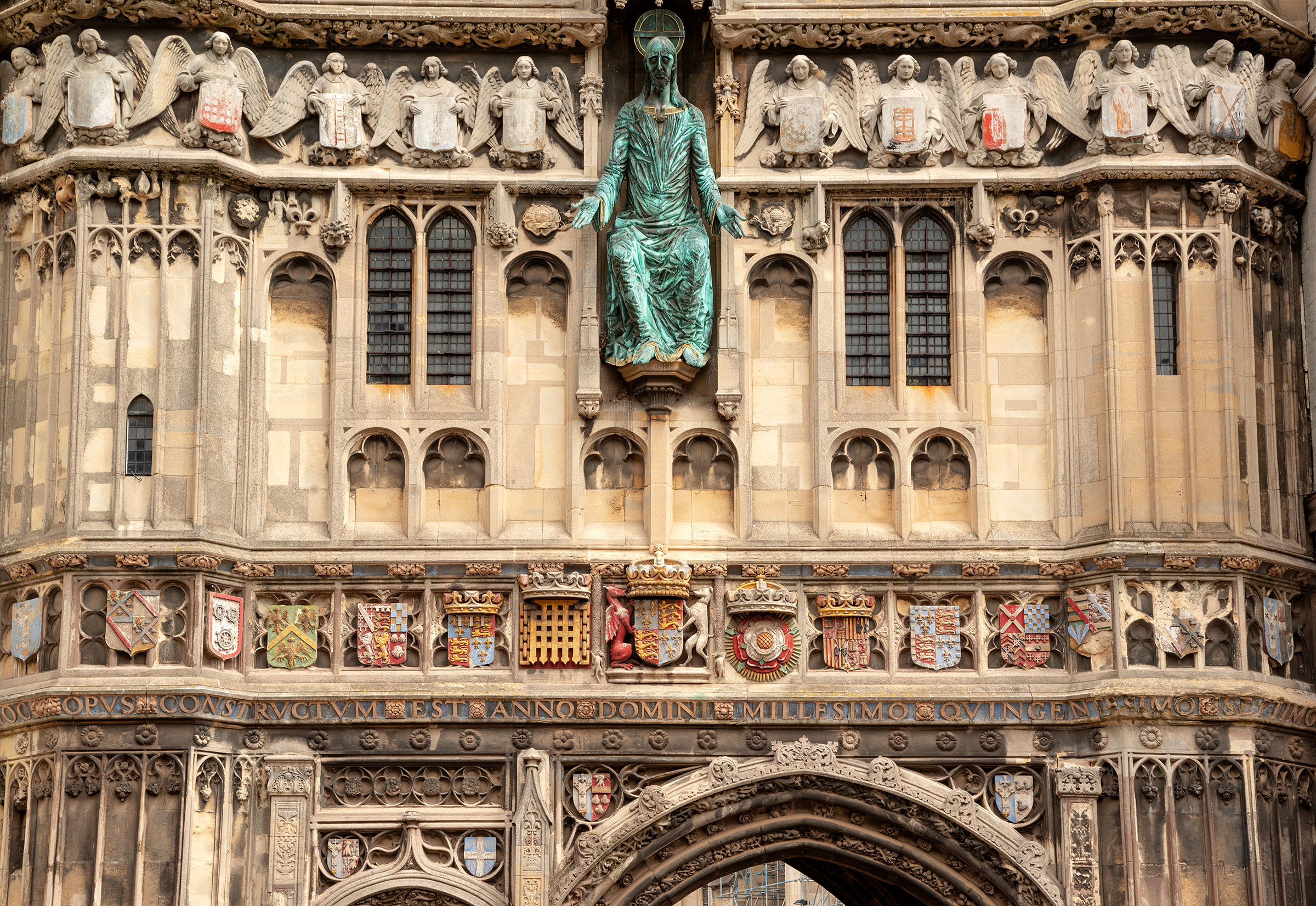
The Christchurch Gate with the new (1990) bronze statue of Christ; the original was destroyed in 1643

The original towers of Christ Church Gate were removed in 1803 and were replaced in 1937. The statue of Christ was replaced in 1990 with a bronze sculpture of Christ by Klaus Ringwald.

The original Norman northwest tower, which had a lead spire until 1705, was demolished in 1834 owing to structural concerns. It was replaced with a Perpendicular-style twin of the southwest tower (designed by Thomas Mapilton), now known as the Arundel Tower, providing a more symmetrical appearance for the cathedral. This was the last major structural alteration to the cathedral to be made.

In 1866, there were six residentiary canonries, of which one was annexed to the Archdeaconry of Canterbury and another to that of Maidstone. In September 1872, a large portion of the Trinity Chapel roof was completely destroyed by fire. There was no significant damage to the stonework or interior and the damage was quickly repaired.

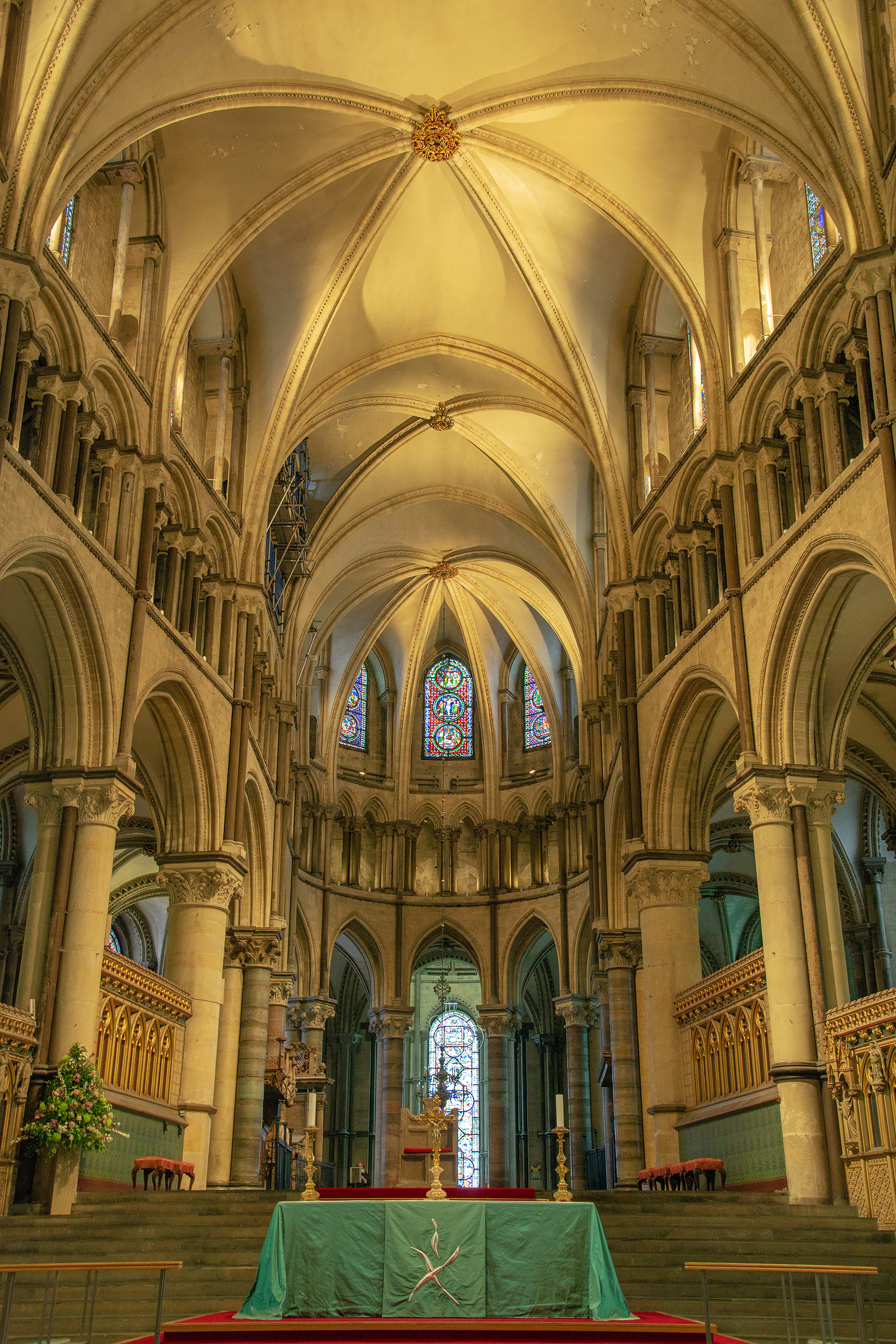
The cathedral did not sustain serious damage during either World War.

During the bombing raids of the Second World War its library was destroyed, but the cathedral did not sustain extensive bomb damage; the local Fire Wardens doused any flames on the wooden roof.

In 1986, a new Martyrdom Altar was installed in the northwest transept, on the spot where Thomas Becket was slain, the first new altar in the cathedral for 448 years. Mounted on the wall above it, there is a metal sculpture by Truro sculptor Giles Blomfield depicting a cross flanked by two bloodstained swords which, together with the shadows they cast, represent the four knights who killed Becket. A stone plaque also commemorates Pope John Paul II's visit to the United Kingdom in 1982. Antony Gormley's sculpture Transport was unveiled in the crypt in 2011. It is made from iron nails from the roof of the south-east transept.

In 2015, Sarah Mullally and Rachel Treweek became the first women to be ordained as bishops in the cathedral, as Bishop of Crediton and Bishop of Gloucester respectively. In 2022, it was announced that David Monteith, who is gay and in a civil partnership, would serve as dean of the cathedral. His appointment was criticised by the Global South Fellowship of Anglican Churches (GSFA) and the Global Fellowship of Confessing Anglicans (GAFCON); the Church of England defended the decision stating that Monteith lives chastely with his partner. In 2024, the cathedral began offering blessings for same-sex couples "already in civil partnerships or civil marriages" or in "covenanted friendship" during ordinary or regular church services in accordance with "Prayers of Love and Faith".

The cathedral is Regimental Church of the Princess of Wales's Royal Regiment and a graduation venue for the University of Kent and Canterbury Christ Church University. The cathedral houses a canvas depicting the "Adoration of the Shepherds" that was attributed to Bartolomeo Schedoni but has been identified as a lost work by Gregorio Pagani, specifically the painting previously thought lost that was once in the Cook collection in Richmond and later in the Wetzler collection in London.

== Conservation ==
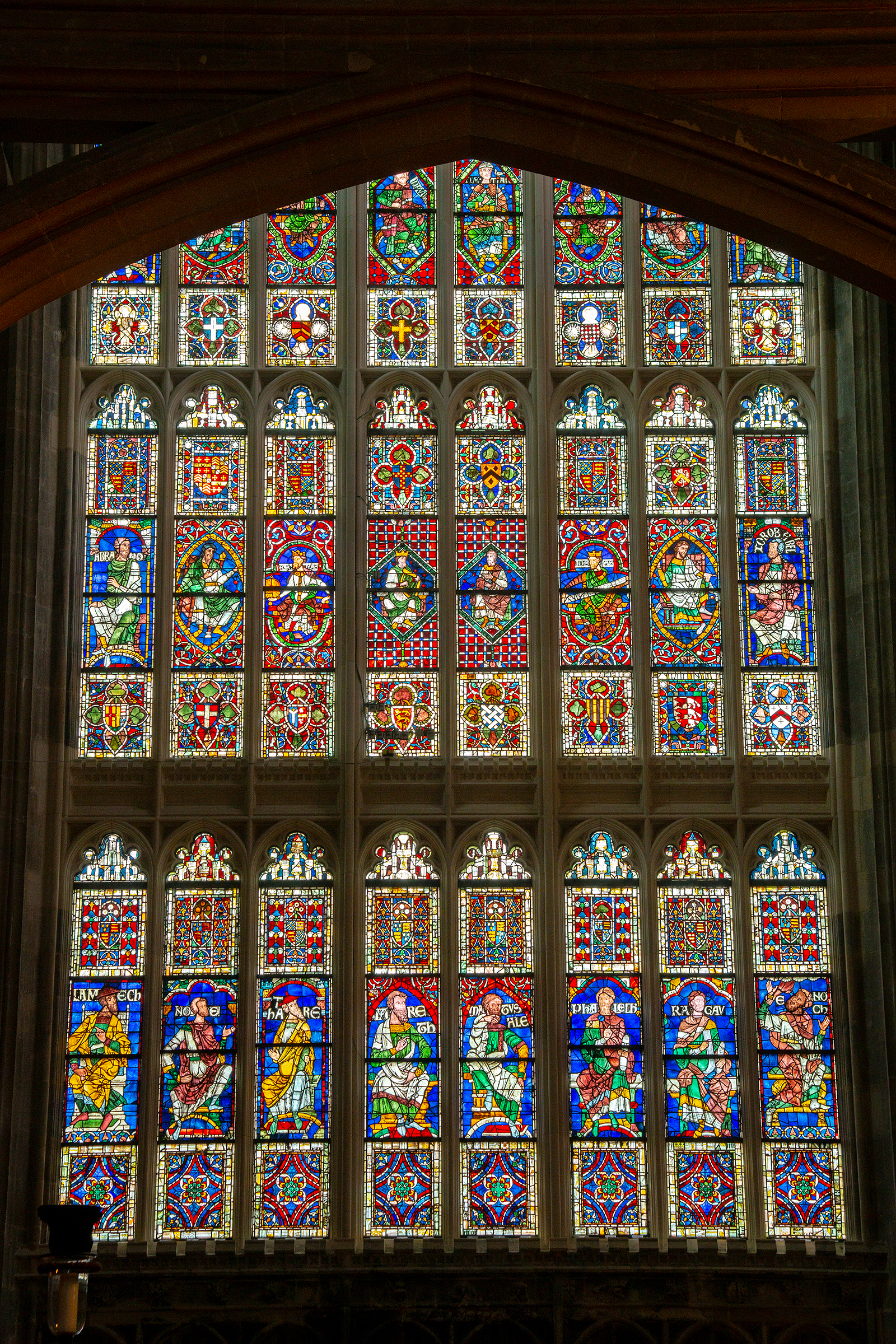
One of the many stained-glass windows at Canterbury Cathedral

Due to its size, age and significance, the conservation of the cathedral is an ongoing task. The roofs and the internationally important stained glass have been cause for particular concern. In 2018, the Thomas Becket Miracle Windows Research and Conservation Project, led by Léonie Seliger and Dr Rachel Koopmans, analysed and conserved the eight 12th century windows in the Trinity Chapel.

During the autumn of 2008, a major restoration of the lead roof over the transept was completed at a cost of approximately £500,000. In 2018, the lead roof of the nave was replaced, with a temporary platform installed under the vaults to enable conservation, part of a 2016–2022 programme that also included improved landscaping and accessibility, new visitor facilities and a general external restoration. The so-called Canterbury Journey project was expected to cost nearly £25 million; the funding included a £13.8 million Heritage Lottery grant, £10.9 million from the Canterbury Cathedral Trust and £250,000 from the Friends of the Cathedral. The final cost was £34.5m.

== Historic designations ==
The cathedral and its precincts comprise a large number of listed buildings. The majority are listed at Grade I, the highest grade, with a much smaller number listed at Grade II*.

=== Grade I ===
The cathedral itself is listed at Grade I. Other Grade I listed buildings include: the Chapter House, the main gate into the cathedral precincts, the cloister, a passageway known as the Dark Entry, the Lavatory Tower, the Library, Meister Omers, at No.16 The Precincts, originally a guest house for visitors, the Norman Staircase, the Prior Sellinge Gate, the Prior's Chapel, the remains of the Cellarer's Hall in the Archbishop's Palace Garden, the Archbishop's Palace itself, the Archdeacon of Canterbury's House, the Cathedral Appeal Fund Office & the Deanery, the Wolfson Library, and Nos. 22–26 and 27 and 28 The Precincts.

=== Grade II* ===
Buildings listed at Grade II* include; No.17 Cathedral Precincts, the Pilgrims Entry or Pentise attached to Number 29, Cathedral Precincts and the County of Kent War Memorial Cross.

=== Scheduled monuments ===
Christchurch Priory and the Archbishop's Palace, and the Norman Staircase, the Cellarer's Hall, and the Pilgrim's Entry are also designated scheduled monuments, the latter three under a composite listing, Monuments in the precinct of Canterbury Cathedral.

== Foundation ==
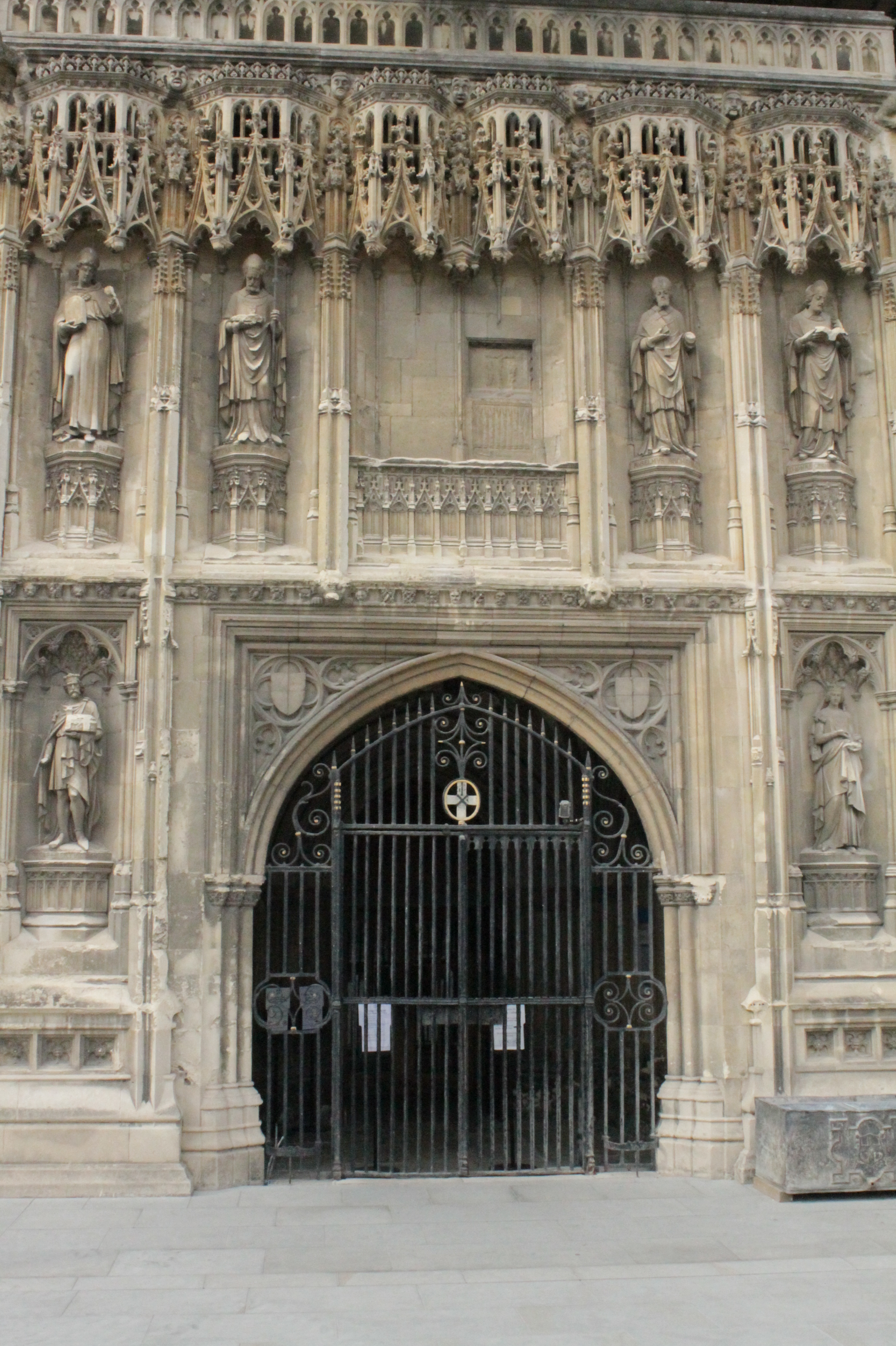
Main west entrance, Canterbury Cathedral

The Foundation is the authorised staffing establishment of the cathedral, few of whom are clergy. The head of the cathedral is the Dean, currently David Monteith, who is assisted by a chapter of 30 canons, four of whom are residentiary, the others being honorary appointments of senior clergy in the diocese. There are also a number of lay canons who all together form the greater chapter which has the legal responsibility both for the cathedral itself and also for the formal election of an archbishop when there is a vacancy-in-see. By English law and custom, they may only elect the person who has been nominated by the monarch on the advice of the prime minister. The Foundation also includes the choristers, lay clerks, organists, King's Scholars, the Six Preachers and a range of other officers; some of these posts are moribund, such as that of the cathedral barber. The cathedral has a workforce of over 300 (many of whom work part-time), and approximately 800 volunteers.

=== Dean and Chapter ===
As of 23 December 2025:

- Dean – David Monteith (since 17 December 2022)
- Archdeacon of Canterbury and Canon Residentiary – William Adam (Archdeacon and Canon since 18 July 2022 collation)
- Canon Precentor – Lindsay Yates (since 2 November 2025)
- Canon Missioner – Emma Pennington (since 16 March 2019)
- Canon Treasurer (Diocesan Canon) – Andrew Dodd (since 27 September 2020 installation)

The Cathedral uses "Vice Dean" not of one particular appointee, but to refer to the Canon in Residence for each month.

=== Finance ===
Canterbury Cathedral receives no government or state funding and only occasional grants from English Heritage. It is not funded by the Church of England. The Church Commissioners pay the salary of the dean and two of the residentiary canons only. The cathedral is therefore largely self-funded.

It costs around £20,000 per day to maintain the cathedral. (2023) In order to meet these costs the cathedral has to rely on income from entry fees paid by visitors and a number of commercial operations such as property rental, the Cathedral Shop, as well as the Cathedral Lodge Hotel and Conference Centre.

The Friends of Canterbury Cathedral is a charity which exists to "cherish the history and beauty of the Cathedral; to preserve its fabric, worship, ornaments and furnishings and to provide a channel for individuals to show their support". The Friends have published Canterbury Cathedral chronicle since 1928. The Friends have also published a number of books relating to the cathedral; these include The Romance of Canterbury Cathedral issued anonymously in 1932 by Raphael Tuck; the author was Margaret Agnes Babington (died 1958) whose name appeared in some of the later editions. Margaret Babington was honorary steward and treasurer of the Friends and undertook fund raising lecture tours for the cathedral. She was the daughter of the vicar of Tenterden.

==== Appeal ====
The "Save Canterbury Cathedral" appeal was launched in October 2006 to protect and enhance the cathedral's future as a centre of worship, heritage and culture. The aim was to raise £50 million; by the end of 2010 the appeal had raised £11.5 million, and as at May 2014 over £20 million had been raised.

The core part of the fundraising programme is focused on the cathedral's fabric. The major conservation-restoration projects already identified will cost £30 million. Fabric conservation is the most urgent element of the campaign. The appeal – the third of its kind following major fundraising drives at Canterbury in the 1950s and 1970s – was launched to fund these projects. Fundraising for the appeal will take place over a number of years both nationally and internationally, stressing the cathedral's role as the mother church of the worldwide Anglican Communion and as a World Heritage Site. An integrated conservation programme that addresses the priority areas has been drawn up by the cathedral's Surveyor to the Fabric, John Burton.

Major repair and conservation projects to be funded by the appeal include roofs of the nave, aisles, and North West and South East Transepts; stone carvings, pinnacles and stone facings of the central Bell Harry Tower; work on the North side of the Corona Chapel; conservation of the Christ Church Gate entry to the Precincts; conservation of stained glass and surrounding stonework throughout the cathedral; and preservation of the collection of historic books and manuscripts.

In addition, there are plans to refurbish the cathedral pipe organ and renovations to the Choir House have already been completed, providing better facilities for choristers. Improvements are planned to the fabric of the library buildings and to the cathedral's audio-visual and lighting systems which will significantly benefit visitors including the disabled, visually impaired and hard of hearing. The appeal also aims to develop the outmoded workshop area and stained glass studio, in order to ensure the survival of Canterbury as a centre of excellence for vital craft skills and to promote a sustainable maintenance base for work on the cathedral which can be viewed by the public.

The fundraising group is the Canterbury Cathedral Trust, an independent, registered charity (1112590) seeking funds to provide conservation, craftsmanship, music and education. Since mid-2017, the Chief Executive has been Sarah Frankland. The Trust was able to obtain the £24.7m needed for The Canterbury Journey multi-year restoration programme which was planned for completion in 2021. In 2016–17 the Trust received £3.66m in donations and an additional £1.61m had been pledged for future projects. The next plan was to raise funds to restore and improve the Quire organ by 2020. In 2017, the cathedral was planning to have the new Welcome Centre open in 2019, with exhibition spaces and viewing gallery.

=== Police service ===
The cathedral has its own police service, known as the Canterbury Cathedral Close Constables. They are attested Constables, with powers of arrest, who police and protect the Cathedral and Close. They also work with Kent Police.

== Music ==
Polyphonic music written for the monks the once monastic cathedral survives from the 13th century. The cathedral may have had an organ as early as the 12th century, though the names of organists are only recorded from the early 15th century. One of the earliest named composers associated with Canterbury Cathedral was Leonel Power, who was appointed master of the new Lady Chapel choir formed in 1438.

The Reformation brought a period of decline in the cathedral's music which was revived under Dean Thomas Neville in the early 17th century. Neville introduced instrumentalists into the cathedral's music who played cornett and sackbut, probably members of the city's band of waits. The cathedral acquired sets of recorders, lutes and viols for the use of the choir boys and lay-clerks.

=== Organ ===
The organ at Canterbury is of four manuals and is in both south and the north quire aisles, as well as a nave division. It was built in 1886 by Henry Willis and subsequently rebuilt by the same firm in the mid-20th century. It was rebuilt by N. P. Mander in 1978 and reduced to three manuals at about that time. David Flood, Organist and Master of the Choristers for over 40 years, oversaw the redesign, specification and total expansion and rebuilding project of the Cathedral Organ in 2018–2020 The organ has now been fully restored and greatly enlarged, including reinstating the fourth manual, by Harrison and Harrison with work finishing in February 2020.

=== Organists ===
Organists and assistant organists at Canterbury Cathedral have included composers William Shelbye, Clement Charlton Palmer, Gerald Hocken Knight and Philip Moore and musical directors Allan Wicks and Stephen Darlington. Following 42 years as both Assistant Organist and Organist and Master of the Choristers, David Flood retired on 29 December 2020. Following 10 years as assistant organist and latterly director of the Girls' Choir and a period as acting director of music, David Newsholme was appointed Director of Music in July 2021. The Assistant Organist is Jamie Rogers and he was appointed in December 2021.

=== Choirs ===
There has been a choral tradition at Canterbury Cathedral for 1400 years. The cathedral choir consists of boys aged eight to fourteen and girls aged twelve to eighteen with 12 lay clerks and choral scholars. Choristers can be from any school, although before February 2023, choristers had to board or attend St Edmund's School under a choral scholarship. This changed under the leadership of David Monteith, Dean of Canterbury under the Equality and Inclusion Plan. The changing of this tradition prompted some criticism.

There are seven choral services a week with Choral Evensong at 5:30 pm Monday through Sunday, although it is not live-streamed on Thursday. There is Sung Eucharist on Sunday at 11 am and extra choral services on important dates such as: Christmas, Easter, and Pentecost.

The Girls' Choir of Canterbury Cathedral was founded in 2014 and their first performance was at Evensong that January. It was attended by more than 600 people and widely covered by the international press. They gave their first concert in December of that year.

== Bells ==
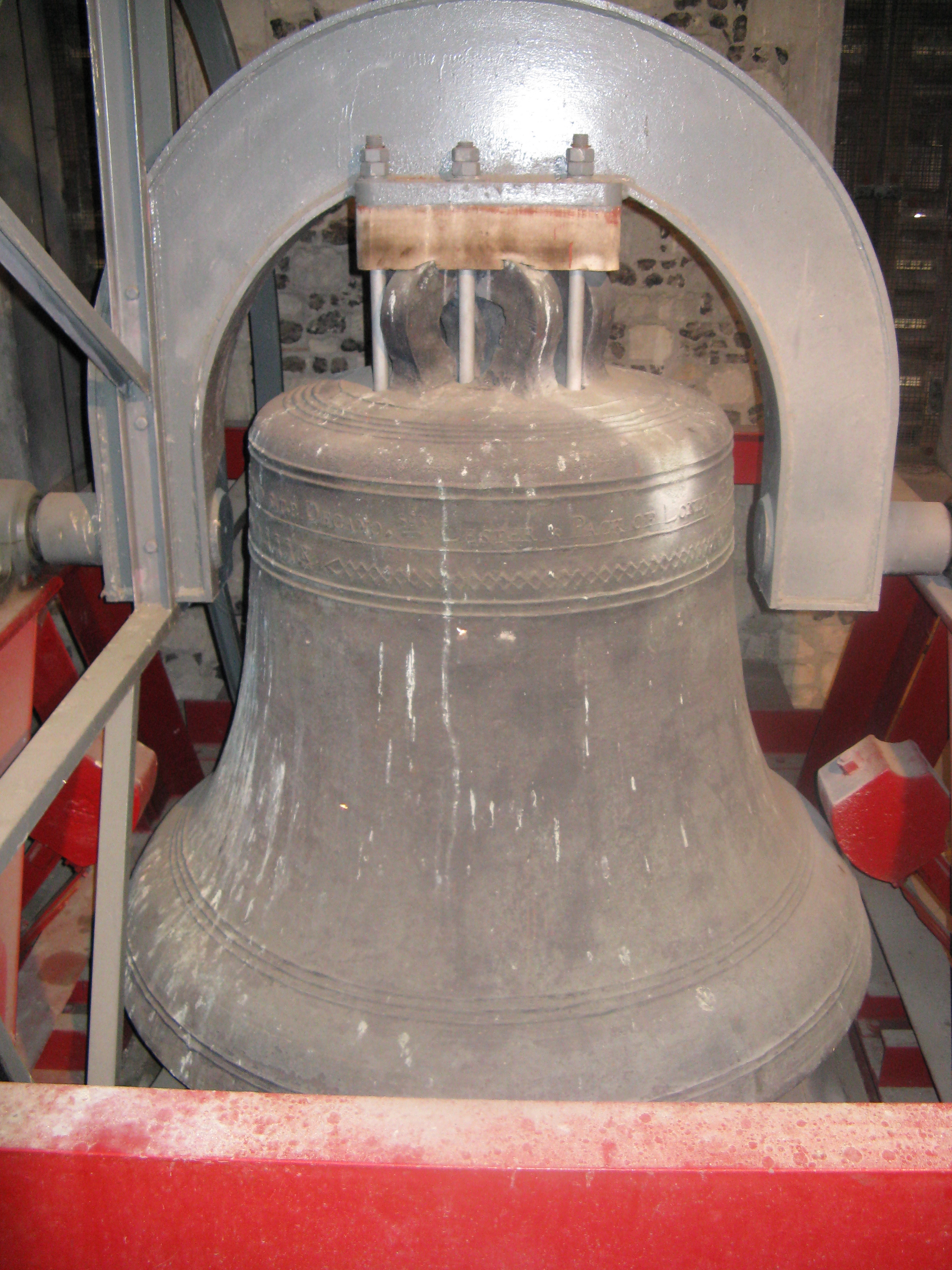
Great Dunstan. Recording on YouTube

The cathedral has a total of 21 bells in three of its five towers: The South West Tower (Oxford Tower) contains the cathedral's main ring of bells, hung for change ringing in the English style. There are fourteen bells – a ring of twelve with two semitones, which allow for ringing on ten, eight or six bells while still remaining in tune. All of the bells were cast in 1981 by the Whitechapel Bell Foundry from seven bells of the old peal of twelve with new metal added and rehung in a new frame. The length (draught) of the ropes was increased by lowering the floor of the ringing chamber to the level of the south aisle vault at the same time, also allowing for the new bells to be set lower in the belfry than the old, with the intention of reducing stress on the Medieval structure. The heaviest bell (tenor) of this ring weighs 34 long cwt 3 qr 4 lb (3,896 lb or 1,767 kg). The ringers practise on Thursday at 7:15 pm.

The North West Tower (Arundel Tower) contains the cathedral's clock chime. The five-quarter chimes were taken from the old peal of twelve in the Oxford Tower (where the clock was originally), and hung from beams in the Arundel Tower. The chimes are struck on the eighth Gregorian tone, which is also used at Merton College, Oxford. The hour is struck on the cathedral's bourdon bell Great Dunstan, the largest bell in Kent at 62 long cwt 2 qr 9 lb (7,009 lb or 3,179 kg), which is also swung on Sunday mornings for Matins.

In 1316 Prior Henry of Eastry gave a large bell dedicated to Saint Thomas, which weighed 71 1/2 cwt (3,630 kg). Later, in 1343, Prior Hathbrand gave bells dedicated to Jesus and St Dunstan. At this time the bells in campanile were rehung and their names recorded as "Jesus", "Dunstan", "Mary", "Crundale", "Elphy" (Ælfheah) and "Thomas". In the 1382 Dover Straits earthquake the campanile fell, destroying the first three named bells. Following its reconstruction, the other three bells were rehung, together with two others, of whose casting no record remains.

The oldest bell in the cathedral is Bell Harry (approximately 8 long cwt (900 lb or 400 kg)), which hangs in a cage on the top of the central tower to which the bell lends its name. This bell was cast by Joseph Hatch in 1635, and is struck at 8 am and 9 pm every day to announce the opening and closing of the cathedral, and also occasionally for services as a Sanctus bell.

The cathedral also has custody of the bell of HMS Canterbury, a World War I-era light cruiser, hung near the Buffs Chapel in the southwest transept.

== Library ==
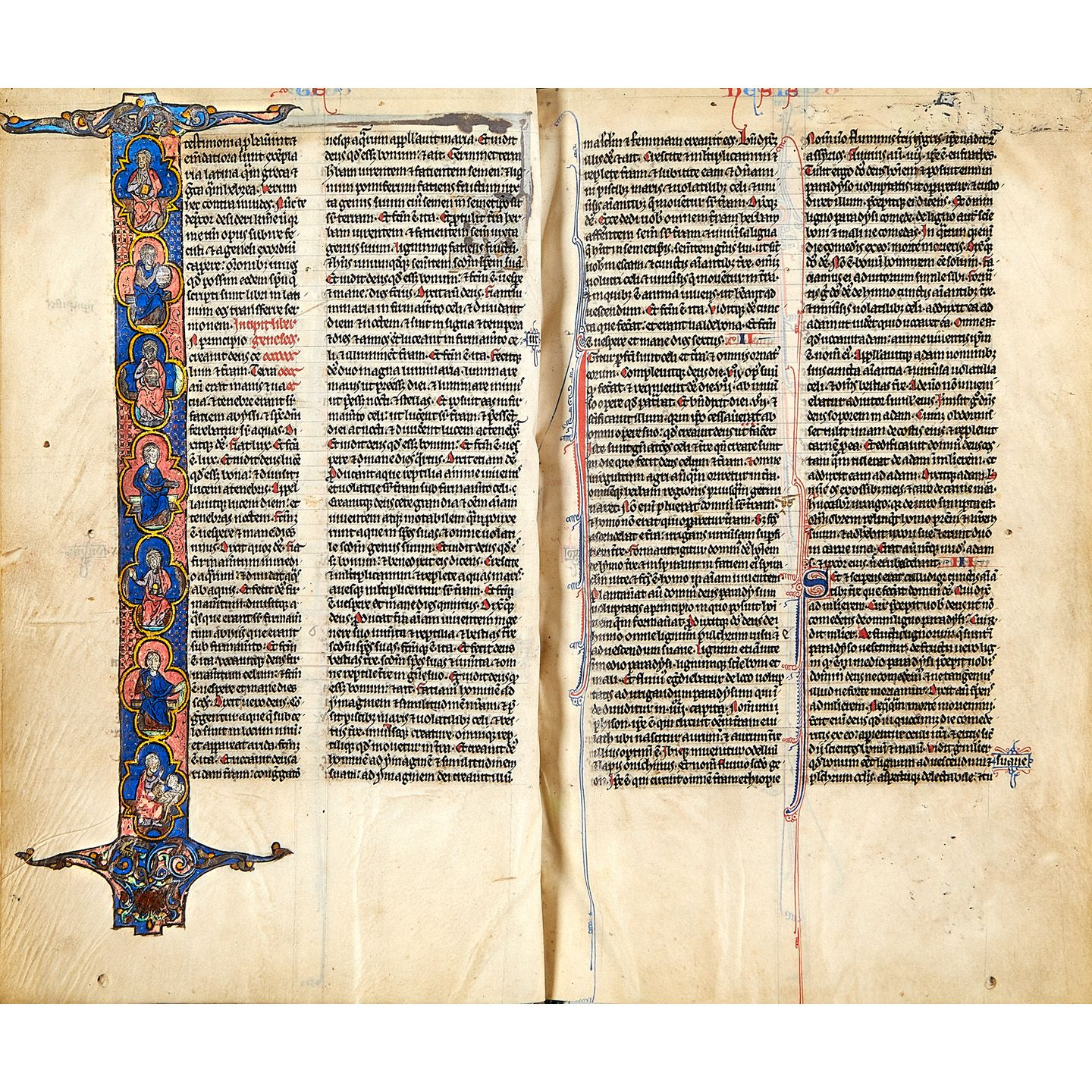
Two leaves from the Lyghfield Bible

The library at Canterbury Cathedral has been in operation since the Middle Ages, and thus possesses a large number and variety items from the time period. Certain items within the library's collections that survived the turmoils surrounding the dissolution of the monasteries have been a part of the collection for nearly a millennium.

The cathedral library has a collection of about 30,000 books and pamphlets printed before the 20th century and about 20,000 later books and serials. Many of the earlier books were acquired as part of donated collections. It is rich in church history, older theology, British history (including local history), travel, science and medicine, and the anti-slavery movement. The library's holdings are included in the online catalogue of the library of the University of Kent.

In July 2018, the cathedral purchased at auction a medieval Trussel Bible for £100,000. This Bible, subsequently renamed the "Lyghfield Bible", after the monk William Lighfyld, had previously been at Canterbury, and had been removed following the dissolution of the monasteries.

== See also ==
- Alexander of Canterbury
- Architecture of the medieval cathedrals of England
- Dean of Canterbury
- Early Gothic architecture
- English Gothic architecture
- English Gothic stained glass windows
- List of cathedrals in England
- List of Gothic cathedrals in Europe
- List of tallest structures built before the 20th century
- Prior of Christ Church
- Poor Man's Bible
- Religion in the United Kingdom

== Bibliography ==
- Babington, Margaret (1955), The Romance of Canterbury Cathedral, Raphael Tuck
- Blick, Sarah (2005), "Reconstructing the Shrine of St. Thomas Becket, Canterbury Cathedral", in Blick, Sarah; Tekippe, Rita (eds.), Art and architecture of late medieval pilgrimage in Northern Europe and the British Isles, Leiden and Boston: Brill
- Collinson, Patrick; Ramsay, Nigel; Sparks, Margaret, eds. (2002) [1995], A History of Canterbury Cathedral (revised ed.), Oxford University Press, ISBN 019820051X
- Cook, G. H. (1949), Portrait of Canterbury Cathedral, London: Phoenix House
- Farmer, David Hugh (1992), The Oxford Dictionary of Saints (3rd ed.), Oxford University Press, ISBN 0192830694
- Iremonger, F. A. (1948), William Temple, Archbishop of Canterbury – his life and letters, Oxford University Press
- Purcell, William (1969), Fisher of Lambeth: a portrait from life, Hodder and Stoughton, ISBN 0340029382
- Stahlschmidt, J. C. L. (1887), The Church Bells of Kent: Their Inscriptions, Founders, Uses and Traditions, Elliot Stock, OCLC 12772194
- Willis, Robert (1845), The Architectural History of Canterbury Cathedral, London: Longman
- Withers, Hartley (1897), The Cathedral Church of Canterbury, Bell's Cathedral Series (2nd revised ed.), London: George Bell, archived from the original on 4 June 2018
