= List of archbishops of Canterbury =

Senior bishops of the Church of England, originally of the Catholic church in England

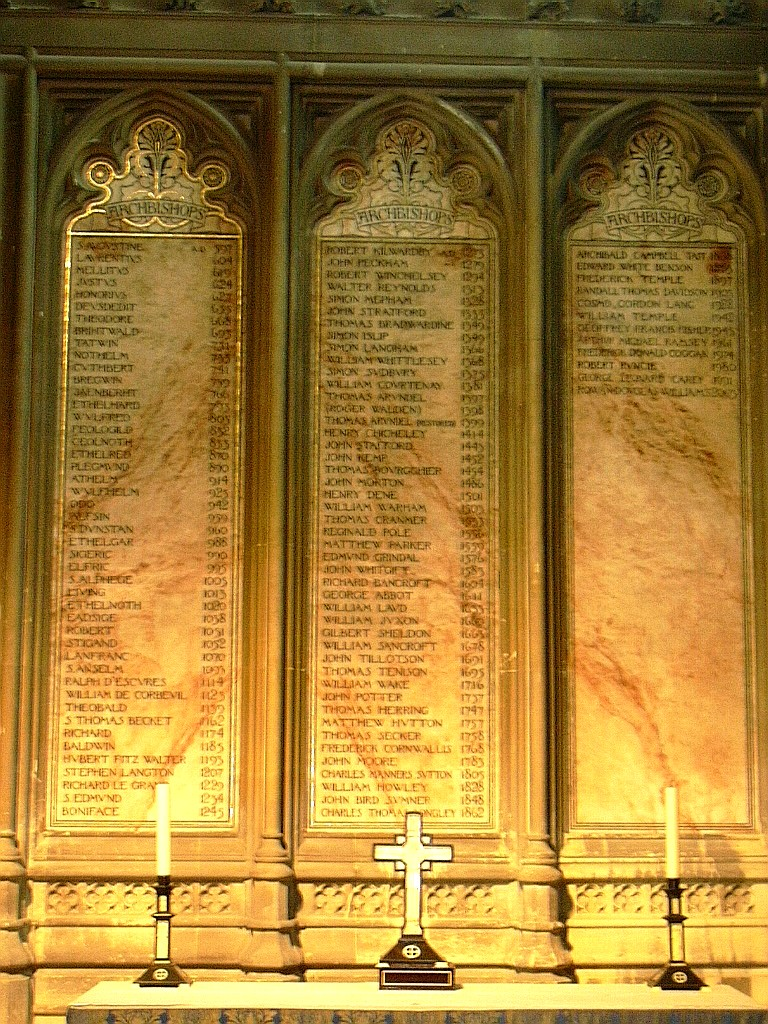
List of the archbishops of Canterbury up to Rowan Williams (2002–2012), in Canterbury Cathedral

The archbishop of Canterbury is the most senior bishop of the established Church of England as "Primate of All England". They also serve as the head of the worldwide Anglican Communion.

Before the Reformation, the archbishop served as a prelate of the Catholic Church.

== History ==
From the 6th century to the 16th century, the archbishops of Canterbury were in full communion with the bishops of Rome, the popes. Eighteen such pre-Reformation archbishops have been canonised by the Catholic Church. During the English Reformation, the English Church broke away from the authority of the pope, at first temporarily, later permanently, recognising only the English monarch as a source of superior temporal authority.

In the Middle Ages there was considerable variation in the nomination procedure of the archbishop and other bishops. At various times the nomination was made by the canons of Canterbury Cathedral, the English monarch, or the pope. Since the Reformation, the church is explicitly a state church and nomination is legally that of the British crown; today it is made in the name of the monarch by the prime minister of the United Kingdom, from a shortlist of two selected by the Crown Nominations Commission, an ad hoc committee.

Today the archbishop has four main roles:

- To be diocesan bishop of the Diocese of Canterbury, which covers the east of the County of Kent and the extreme north-east of Surrey. Founded by Augustine of Canterbury in 597, it is the oldest bishopric in the English church. The main duties of this role are delegated to the suffragan bishop of Dover (who in this capacity is called the "bishop in Canterbury").
- To be metropolitan bishop of the Province of Canterbury, encompassing 30 dioceses in the southern two-thirds of England. The remaining 14 dioceses in the north of England fall within the Province of York, under the authority of the archbishop of York. Four dioceses in Wales were under the Province of Canterbury until they were transferred to the dis-established Church in Wales in 1920.
- As "Primate of All England", to be the chief religious figure in the Church of England (senior to the archbishop of York, who is styled the "Primate of England"). The British monarch is the supreme governor of the Church of England.
- As symbolic head of the Anglican Communion, the archbishop is recognised as primus inter pares ("first among equals") of all Anglican primates.

== Heraldry ==
Much heraldry relating to archbishops of Canterbury is displayed in the church of St Mary-at-Lambeth in London, near to Lambeth Palace the London seat of the archbishops.

== List of archbishops ==
Key to abbreviations in tables below
bet.	between
c.	circa
dep.	deposed
deprived	deprived
el.	elected
enth.	enthroned
nom.	nominated
pos.	postulated
tr.	translated
res.	resigned

=== Old English period ===
From^{[A]}	Until^{[B]}	Incumbent	Notes
597	26 May 604 or 605	Augustine	Canonised: St Augustine of Canterbury.
c. 604	2 Feb 619	Laurence	(Laurentius, Lawrence) Canonised: St Laurence of Canterbury.
619	24 Apr 624	Mellitus	Translated from London; canonised: St Mellitus.
624	10 Nov bet. 627 and 631	Justus	Translated from Rochester; canonised: St Justus.
627	30 Sep 653	Honorius	Canonised: St Honorius.
Mar 655	14 Jul 664	Deusdedit	Canonised: St Deusdedit.
14 Jul 664	c. 666	See vacant	
c. 666	668	(Wighard)	(Wigheard) Died of plague before consecration.
26 Mar 668	19 Sep 690	Theodore	Canonised: St Theodore of Tarsus.
29 Jun 693	13 Jan 731	Berhtwald	(Brihtwald, Beorhtweald, Bertwald, Berthwald, Beorhtwald, or Beretuald) Abbot of Reculver; canonised: St Berhtwald.
10 Jun 731	30 Jul 734	Tatwine	(Tatwin, Tatuini, or Tadwinus) Canonised: St Tatwine.
735	17 Oct 739	Nothhelm	(Nothelm) Canonised: St Nothelm.
c. 740	26 Oct 760	Cuthbert	Canonised: Possibly translated from Hereford.
27 Sep 761	764	Bregowine	(Bregwine or Bregwin) Canonised: St Bregwin.
2 Feb 765	11/12 Aug 792	Jænberht	(Jambert, Jaenbeorht, Jænbert, Jaenberht, Jaenbert, or Jaenberht) Abbot of St Augustine's, Canterbury.
21 Jul 793	12 May 805	Æthelhard	(Ethelhard, Æthilheard, or Aethelheard)
c. Oct 805	21 Mar 832	Wulfred	
8 Jun 832	30 Aug 832	Feologild	(Feologeld) Abbot of an unknown monastery before election.
c. 27 Jul 833	4 Feb 870	Ceolnoth	
870	30 Jun 888	Æthelred	(Ethelred)
890	2 Aug 923	Plegmund	(Plegemund) Clerk to King Alfred.
bet. 923 and 925	8 Jan 926	Athelm	(Æðelhelm) Translated from Wells.
c. 926	12 Feb 941	Wulfhelm	Translated from Wells.
941	2 Jun 958	Oda	(Odo, Oda the Severe) Translated from Ramsbury; canonised: St Oda.
958	959	Ælfsige	(Aelfsige)
959	dep. 959	Byrhthelm	(Beorhthelm or Birthelm) Translated from Wells, deposed & returned to Wells.
959	19 May 988	Dunstan OSB	Translated from London; previously abbot of Glastonbury; canonised: St Dunstan.
988	Feb 990	Æthelgar	Translated from Selsey.
990	28 Oct 994	Sigeric	Translated from Ramsbury.
el. 21 Apr 995	16 Nov 1005	Ælfric of Abingdon	(Ælfric of Wessex) Translated from Winchester; canonised: St Aelfric.
1006	19 Apr 1012	Ælfheah	(Alphege, Elphege, Alfege, or Godwine) Translated from Winchester; captured by Viking raiders and killed at Greenwich; canonised: St Alphege.
1013	12 Jun 1020	Lyfing	Translated from Wells.
13 Nov 1020	c. 29 Oct 1038	Æthelnoth	(Aethelnoth, Ethelnoth, Egelnodus, or Ednodus) Formerly Dean of Canterbury.
1038	29 Oct 1050	Eadsige	(Eadsige, Eadsimus, or Eadsin)
Mar 1051	dep. Sep 1052	Robert of Jumièges	(Robert Chambert or Robert Champart) Deposed.
1052	deprived 11 Apr 1070	Stigand	Concurrently Bishop of Winchester; deprived of both sees.

=== After the Norman conquest ===
From^{[A]}	Until^{[B]}	Incumbent	Notes
29 Aug 1070	28 May 1089	Lanfranc OSB	Abbot of St. Étienne, Caen.
28 May 1089	4 Dec 1093	See vacant	
4 Dec 1093	21 Apr 1109	Anselm OSB	Abbot of Bec; Canonised: St Anselm.
21 Apr 1109	26 Apr 1114	See vacant	
el. 26 Apr 1114	2 Oct 1122	Ralph d'Escures	Translated from Rochester.
18 Feb 1123	21 Nov 1136	William de Corbeil	(William of Corbeil) Prior of St Osyth.
21 Nov 1136	8 Jan 1139	See vacant	
8 Jan 1139	18 Apr 1161	Theobald of Bec OSB	(Tedbald) Abbot of Bec.
18 Apr 1161	3 Jun 1162	See vacant	
3 Jun 1162	29 Dec 1170	Thomas Becket	(Thomas of London, Thomas à Becket) Previously Archdeacon of Canterbury and Lord Chancellor; assassinated; canonised: St Thomas of Canterbury.
1173		(Roger de Bailleul)	Abbot of Le Bec-Hellouin; elected but declined the see.
7 Apr 1174	16 Feb 1184	Richard OSB	(Richard of Dover) Prior of Dover.
tr. Dec 1184	Nov 1190	Baldwin of Forde OCist	Translated from Worcester; previously abbot of Forde.
el. 27 Nov 1191	26 Dec 1191	(Reginald Fitz Jocelin)	(Reginald Italus, Richard the Lombard, or Reginald Lombardus) Translated from Wells; elected, however, appeals against it were sent to Pope Celestine III, but Reginald died before they were heard.
26 Dec 1191	29 May 1193	See vacant	
tr. 29 May 1193	13 Jul 1205	Hubert Walter	Translated from Salisbury; Lord Chancellor; Chief Justiciar.
el. bet. Jul and Oct 1205	bet. Oct and Dec 1206	(Reginald OSB)	Sub-prior, elected but set aside by Innocent III.
pos. 11 Dec 1205	c. 30 Mar 1206	(John de Gray)	Bishop of Norwich; chosen by the monks but set aside by Pope Innocent III.
17 Jun 1207	9 Jul 1228	Cardinal Stephen Langton	Created a cardinal in 1206.
el. 3 Aug 1228	Jan 1229	(Walter d'Eynsham OSB)	(Walter de Hempsham) Elected but set aside by King Henry III of England and Pope Gregory IX.
10 Jun 1229	3 Aug 1231	Richard le Grant	(Richard Grant or Richard Wethershed) Formerly Chancellor of the see of Lincoln.
pos. 22 Sep 1231	20 Dec 1231	(Ralph Neville)	(Ralf Nevill) Bishop of Chichester, election quashed by Pope Gregory IX.
el. 16 Mar 1232	12 Jun 1232	(John of Sittingbourne)	election quashed by Pope Gregory IX.
el. 26 Aug 1232	1 Jun 1233	(John Blund)	(Johannes Blund, Iohannes Blondus, Iohannes Blundus) election quashed by Pope Gregory IX.
2 Apr 1234	16 Nov 1240	Edmund of Abingdon	Prebendary of Salisbury; canonised as: St Edmund of Abingdon.
el. 1 Feb 1241 ^{[C]}	14 Jul 1270	Boniface of Savoy	Translated from Belley in France
el. 9 Sep 1270	summer 1272	(William Chillenden)	(Adam of Chillenden) Prior of Christ Church, Canterbury; elected but set aside by Pope Gregory X.
26 Feb 1273	res. 5 Jun 1278	Cardinal Robert Kilwardby OP	Created a cardinal in 1278; and resigned.
pos. Jun or Jul 1278	Jan 1279	(Robert Burnell)	(Robert Burnel) Bishop of Bath & Wells; elected but set aside by Pope Nicholas III.
19 Feb 1279	8 Dec 1292	John Peckham OFM	(John Pecham) English Provincial of the Franciscan Order.
12 Sep 1294	11 May 1313	Robert Winchelsey	(Robert Winchelsea) Formerly Archdeacon of Essex; Chancellor of Oxford
el. 28 May 1313	1 Oct 1313	(Thomas Cobham)	Election quashed.
tr. 1 Oct 1313	16 Nov 1327	Walter Reynolds	Translated from Worcester; Lord Chancellor; Lord Treasurer.
5 Jun 1328	12 Oct 1333	Simon Mepeham	(Simon Meopham) Prebendary of Chichester Cathedral; excommunicated.
pos. 3 Nov 1333	23 Aug 1348	John de Stratford	Translated from Winchester; Lord Chancellor.
nom. 24 Sep 1348	20 May 1349	(John de Ufford)	Dean of Lincoln; Lord Chancellor; died of plague before consecration.
19 Jul 1349	26 Aug 1349	Thomas Bradwardine	Died of plague
20 Dec 1349	26 Apr 1366	Simon Islip	Prebendary of St Paul's; secretary to the king and keeper of the Privy Seal.
1366		(William Edington)	(William Edendon) Bishop of Winchester; elected but refused the see.
tr. 24 Jul 1366	res. 28 Nov 1368	Cardinal Simon Langham OSB	Translated from Ely; created a cardinal in 1368; and resigned the see. He was elected a second time in 1374, but Pope Gregory XI refused to confirm the election.
tr. 11 Oct 1368	Jun 1374	William Whittlesey	(William Wittlesey) Translated from Worcester.
tr. 4 May 1375	14 Jun 1381	Simon Sudbury	(Simon de Sudbury; Simon Tibold; Simon Theobold) Translated from London; Lord Chancellor; beheaded during the Peasants' Revolt.
tr. 31 Jul 1381	31 Jul 1396	William Courtenay	Translated from London; Lord Chancellor.
tr. 25 Sep 1396	dep. 1397	Thomas Arundel	(Thomas Fitz-Alan) Translated from York; Lord Chancellor; charged with high treason under Richard II, fled but restored later.
nom. 8 Nov 1397	deprived 19 Oct 1399	Roger Walden	Deprived.
restored 19 Oct 1399	19 Feb 1414	Thomas Arundel (again)	(Thomas Fitz-Alan) Restored by Henry IV.
tr. 12 Mar 1414	12 Apr 1443	Henry Chichele	(Henry Chicheley; Henry Checheley) Translated from St David's.
tr. 13 May 1443	25 May 1452	John Stafford	Translated from Bath & Wells; Lord Chancellor; Lord Treasurer.
tr. 21 Jul 1452	22 Mar 1454	Cardinal John Kemp	Created a cardinal in 1439; Translated from York; Lord Chancellor
tr. 23 Apr 1454	30 Mar 1486	Cardinal Thomas Bourchier	Translated from Ely; Lord Chancellor; created a cardinal in 1467.
tr. 6 Oct 1486	15 Sep 1500	Cardinal John Morton	Translated from Ely; Lord Chancellor. created a cardinal in 1493.
22 Jan 1501	27 Jan 1501	(Thomas Langton)	Bishop of Winchester; died 5 days after being chosen.
tr. 26 Apr 1501	15/17 Feb 1503	Henry Deane	(Henry Dean; Henry Dene) Translated from Salisbury.
tr. 29 Nov 1503	22 Aug 1532	William Warham	Translated from London; Lord Chancellor until 1515.
30 Mar 1533	deprived 13 Nov 1555	Thomas Cranmer	Archdeacon of Taunton; first Protestant archbishop; excommunicated by Rome and deprived for heresy 1553; put to death by burning, 21 March 1556.
22 Mar 1556	18/19 Nov 1558	Cardinal Reginald Pole	Dean of Exeter; created a cardinal in 1536; diocesan administrator since 11 December 1555; last Roman Catholic archbishop.

=== After the Elizabethan Settlement ===
From^{[A]}	Until^{[B]}	Incumbent	Notes
17 Dec 1559	17 May 1575	Matthew Parker	Dean of Lincoln.
tr. 29 Dec 1575	6 Jul 1583	Edmund Grindal	Translated from York.
nom. 14 Aug 1583	29 Feb 1604	John Whitgift	Translated from Worcester.
nom. 9 Oct 1604	2 Nov 1610	Richard Bancroft	Translated from London.
nom. 4 Mar 1611	4 Aug 1633	George Abbot	Translated from London.
nom. 6 Aug 1633	10 Jan 1645	William Laud	Translated from London; executed in office; commemorated in the Church of England and the Episcopal Church in the USA.
10 Jan 1645	1660	See vacant during the Civil War, the Commonwealth and the Protectorate.	
nom. 2 Sep 1660	4 Jun 1663	William Juxon	Translated from London.
nom. 16 June 1663	9 Nov 1677	Gilbert Sheldon	Translated from London.
27 Jan 1678	deprived 1 Feb 1690	William Sancroft	Dean of St Paul's; deprived for not taking oaths to William and Mary; died 24 Nov 1693.
31 May 1691	22 Nov 1694	John Tillotson	Dean of St Paul's.
nom. 6 Dec 1694	14 Dec 1715	Thomas Tenison	Translated from Lincoln.
nom. 17 Dec 1715	24 Jan 1737	William Wake	Translated from Lincoln.
nom. 9 Feb 1737	10 Oct 1747	John Potter	Translated from Oxford.
nom. 21 Oct 1747	13 Mar 1757	Thomas Herring	Translated from York.
nom. 29 Mar 1757	19 Mar 1758	Matthew Hutton	Translated from York.
nom. 8 Mar 1758	3 Aug 1768	Thomas Secker	Translated from Oxford.
nom. 12 Aug 1768	19 Mar 1783	Frederick Cornwallis	Translated from Lichfield & Coventry.
nom. 31 Mar 1783	18 Jan 1805	John Moore	Translated from Bangor.
nom. 1 Feb 1805	21 Jul 1828	Charles Manners-Sutton	Translated from Norwich.
nom. 6 Aug 1828	11 Feb 1848	William Howley	Translated from London.
nom. 17 Feb 1848	6 Sep 1862	John Bird Sumner	Translated from Chester.
nom. 20 Oct 1862	28 Oct 1868	Charles Longley	Translated from York.
nom. 28 Nov 1868	1 Dec 1882	Archibald Campbell Tait	Translated from London.
nom. 13 Jan 1883	11 Oct 1896	Edward White Benson	Translated from Truro.
nom. 9 Nov 1896	22 Dec 1902	Frederick Temple	Translated from London.
nom. 14 Jan 1903	res. 12 Nov 1928	Randall Davidson	Translated from Winchester; retired; died 25 May 1930.
nom. 13 Nov 1928	res. 31 Mar 1942	Cosmo Gordon Lang	Translated from York; retired; died 5 December 1945.
nom. 1 Apr 1942	26 Oct 1944	William Temple	Translated from York. Died in office.
nom. 12 Jan 1945	res. 31 May 1961	Geoffrey Fisher	Translated from London; retired; died 1972.
nom. 1 Jun 1961	res. 15 Nov 1974	Michael Ramsey	Translated from York; retired; died 23 April 1988.
nom. 18 Nov 1974	res. 25 Jan 1980	Donald Coggan	Translated from York; retired; died 17 May 2000.
nom. 1 Feb 1980	res. 31 Jan 1991	Robert Runcie	Translated from St Albans; retired; died 11 Jul 2000.
enth. 19 Apr 1991	res. 31 Oct 2002	George Carey	Translated from Bath & Wells; retired.
el. conf. 2 Dec 2002	res. 31 Dec 2012	Rowan Williams	Translated from Monmouth. He was also Archbishop of Wales. He then returned to academia as Master of Magdalene College, Cambridge.
el. conf. 4 Feb 2013	res. 6 Jan 2025	Justin Welby	Translated from Durham. His appointment began in February 2013; resigned.
el. conf. 28 Jan 2026		Sarah Mullally	Translated from London; Her appointment began on 28 January 2026. First female archbishop.

== Assistant bishops ==
Those who have assisted the diocesan archbishop have included:

Two coadjutors – called Bishop of St Martin's — to Saxon archbishops:

- 1035–1038: Eadsige, who succeeded as Archbishop
- c. 1052 – c. 1061 (d.): Godwin

Lanfranc declared that appointments to that See would cease, and the Bishop of Rochester would deputise instead.

- 1044–1048 (res.): Siward, coadjutor-archbishop/suffragan bishop, probably titular Bishop of Uppsala
- 15 July 1469 – ?: Henry, consecrated to the titular see of Ioppe
- 1469: Thomas Scrope, absentee Bishop of Dromore and assistant Bishop of Norwich (1450–1477)
- 1480: William Westkarre, Prior of Mottisfont, titular bishop of Zeitun and assistant Bishop of Winchester (1457–1486)
- 1526–?: Thomas Chetham was consecrated titular bishop of Sidon on 19 January 1526 to serve as an assistant to the Archbishop of Canterbury and became an assistant to the Bishop of London in 1553

Modern assistant bishops have included:

- 1928–1939 (d.): Arthur Knight, Rector of Lyminge and former Bishop of Rangoon
- 1935–1941 (ret.): Edward Bidwell, Vicar of Sellindge and former Bishop of Ontario
- 1942–1955 (ret.): Basil Roberts, Warden of St Augustine's College and former Bishop of Singapore
- 1960–1961 (res.): Denis Hall, Vicar of Thornton Heath and former Assistant Bishop on the Niger
- 1994–1997 (res.): David Evans, Gen. Sec. of SAMS and former Bishop in Peru

== Notes ==
- ^{A} All start dates are consecration dates, unless otherwise noted.
- ^{B} All end dates are death dates, unless otherwise noted.
- ^{C} He was not consecrated until 15 January 1245.
