= Religion in Mercia =

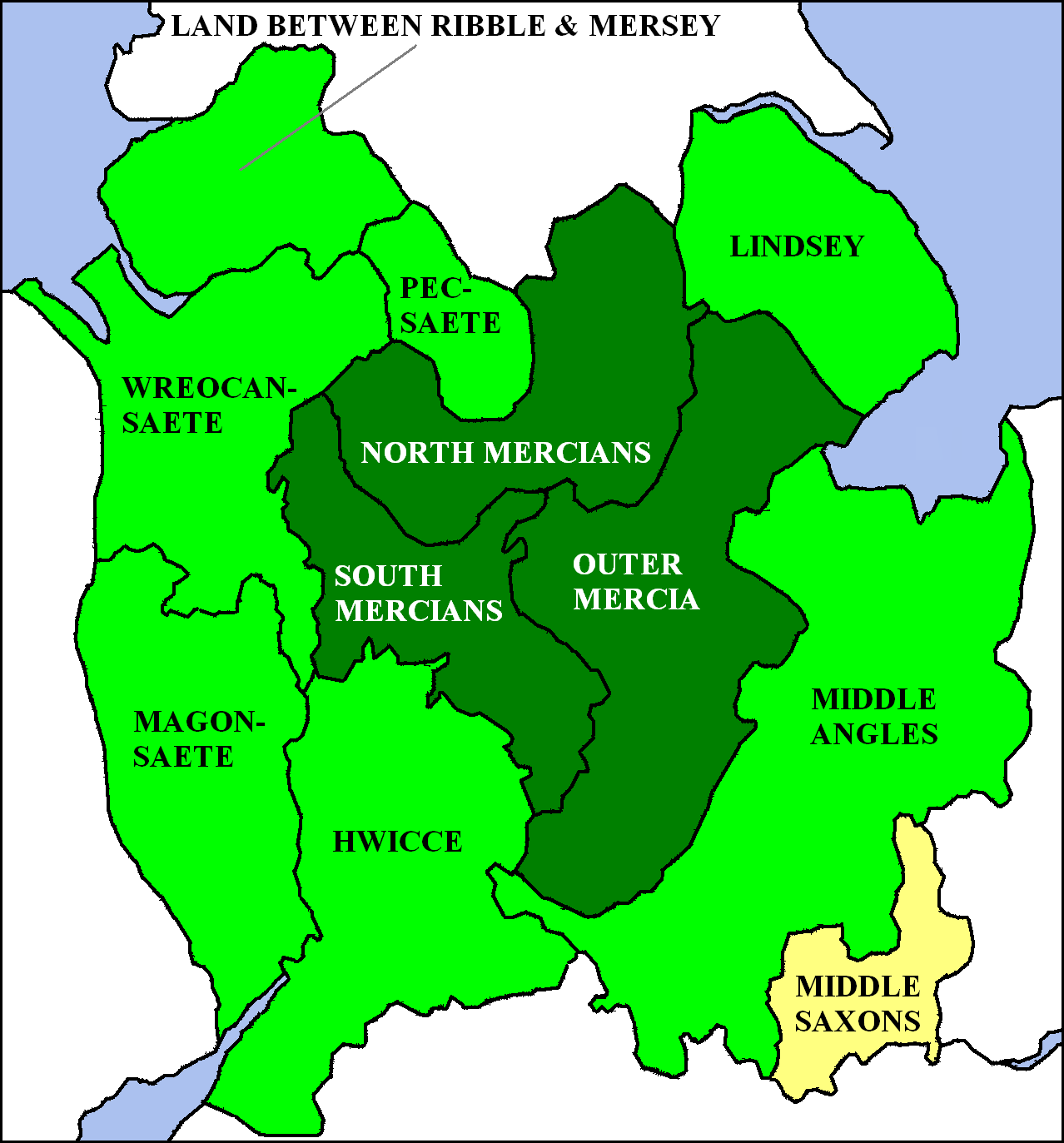
Expansion of the Kingdom of Mercia: dark green 6th century; green 7th century; yellow 8th century.

Throughout its history the Kingdom of Mercia was a battleground between conflicting religious ideologies.

== Early history ==
It is likely that the Anglian occupation of Mercia saw the displacement of, or integration with, Sub-Roman British tribes. There is a possibility that some of these British Christian communities survived the Anglo-Saxon occupation: Richard Fletcher mentions Much Wenlock as a possible candidate.

The first kings of Mercia were pagans, and they resisted the encroachment of Christianity longer than those of other kingdoms in the Anglo-Saxon Heptarchy. Placenames like Wednesfield and Wednesbury perhaps suggest that the worship of Woden was particularly prominent, and that there was a cluster of late pagan practice near Birmingham: there are no surviving toponyms relating to Thunor, for example, although Tiw may be connected to Tyseley, Tysemere and Tysoe. Similarly the Old English word weoh (altar) is found as a root for several Mercian placenames including Weeford near Lichfield.

Mercian rulers remained resolutely pagan until the reign of Peada in 656, although this did not prevent them joining coalitions with Christian Welsh rulers to resist Northumbria. The first appearance of Christianity in Mercia, however, had come at least thirty years earlier, following the Battle of Cirencester of 628, when Penda incorporated the largely Christian West Saxon territories of the Hwiccas into his kingdom.

== The Mercian Supremacy ==
=== Reign of Penda ===
The conversion of Mercia to Christianity occurred in the latter part of the 7th century, and was carried out almost entirely by Northumbrian and Irish monks of the Celtic Rite. Penda remained pagan to the end, but by the time of his defeat and death, Mercia was largely surrounded by Christian states. As such, it was excluded from many of the networks of diplomacy and alliance that extended through Western Europe, as these generally involved dynastic marriages and ecclesiastical negotiation. Christianity gained a foothold in Mercia precisely through these channels. Part of the price of Oswiu's support for Peada as sub-king of the Middle Angles, during the period of Mercian eclipse, was that Peada marry Oswiu's daughter, Alchflaed, and accept her religion. Diuma, an Irish monk and one of Oswiu's missionaries was subsequently ordained a bishop—the first to operate in Mercia. Peada founded an abbey at Medeshamstede, in modern Peterborough, as earnest of his support for the Church. Bede tells us that Penda respected the Christians and even allowed them to operate more widely in Mercia. However, it seems that not much progress was made at converting the nobles and people of Mercia.

=== The mission of Chad ===
After an inconclusive start, decisive steps to Christianise Mercia were taken by Chad (Latinised by Bede as Ceadda), the fifth bishop to minister to the Mercians. He was a controversial figure, who had been removed from his duties among the Northumbrians by the Archbishop Theodore of Tarsus. Finding his realm without a bishop in 669, King Wulfhere requested Theodore to send one, and Theodore despatched Chad. Wulfhere gave him land to build a monastery at Lichfield which is around 7 miles (11 km) north-west of Tamworth. These early bishops were known as bishops of the Middle Angles and/or the Mercians and, in Chad's case, also of the Lindsey people: bishoprics were still ethnic rather than territorial, according to Celtic tradition. Chad tirelessly evangelised Mercia, and Bede credits him with the conversion of the kingdom, despite the briefness of his episcopate—less than three years.

The sons of Penda not only supported Christian missionaries but invested heavily in the Church. Wulfhere greatly endowed the family monastery at Medeshamstede. In addition to the gift of land at Lichfield, he also gave Chad land for a monastery at Barwae—probably the modern Barrow upon Humber. Merewalh, sub-king of the Magonsæte, to the west, in modern Shropshire and Herefordshire, and apparently a brother or half-brother of Wulfhere, fathered a dynasty of abbesses, endowing an abbey at Leominster and probably also that at Much Wenlock, which his daughter Mildburh headed. As in other Anglo-Saxon kingdoms, the many small monasteries allowed the political/military and ecclesiastical leadership to consolidate their unity through bonds of kinship.

=== Division of Mercia into dioceses ===
Map showing the dioceses of southern England during the reign of Offa, when for a short period there was an archbishopric of Lichfield

However, Mercia did not long survive as an ecclesiastical entity. Chad's successor, Winfrith, was expected to conform more closely to Roman norms but was soon at loggerheads with Archbishop Theodore. Involved in similar problems with Wilfrid of York, from 676 Theodore adopted a policy of appointing bishops to much smaller tribal groups within the kingdoms, thus covering smaller areas—closer in size to those found in Francia and other West European countries. Hence, bishoprics were based at Worcester for the Hwiccas, at Hereford for the Magonsæte, at Lincoln for the Lindsey people, the latter attached to York rather than Canterbury, and at Leicester, perhaps for the Middle Angles. This left the remaining diocese still based at Lichfield and still very large, but much more manageable. For a short time, Offa succeeded in restoring the ecclesiastical unity of Mercia, while adding East Anglia to it. Under his influence, the Synod of Chelsea in 787 established an Archbishopric of Lichfield, headed by Higbert, the existing bishop. This arrangement did not long survive Offa himself, and the various dioceses were returned to their original provinces in 803.

== The Danelaw ==
In 867, under Ivar the Boneless, the Danes captured Nottingham. Despite attempts by King Æthelred of Wessex and his brother, Alfred, the Danes remained, establishing Nottingham as one of the five Burghs of the Danelaw. Marching from Lindsey to Repton in 874, Ivar drove Burgred from his kingdom, bringing Norse paganism with him. The north of Mercia remained under pagan influence until Ivar's successor, Guthrum, converted to Christianity at the Treaty of Wedmore in 878.
