= Feologild =

Archbishop of Canterbury in 832

- Archbishop of Canterbury
- Elected: 832
- Term ended: 832
- Predecessor: Wulfred
- Successor: Ceolnoth

Orders
- Consecration: 9 June 832

Personal details
- Died: 30 August 832

Feologild (or Feologeld; died 832) was a medieval English clergyman. He was probably elected Archbishop of Canterbury, although controversy surrounds his election. Some modern historians argue that instead of being elected, he was merely an unsuccessful candidate for the office. He died soon after his consecration, if indeed he was consecrated.

== Background ==
In 803 at the Council of Clovesho, Æthelhard, the Archbishop of Canterbury, succeeded in demoting the Archbishopric of Lichfield back down to a bishopric. It had previously been promoted to a higher status by King Offa of Mercia, partly due to conflicts Offa had with Æthelhard's predecessor Jænberht. This action restored the original episcopal scheme of Pope Gregory the Great, with Canterbury the head of the Church in the southern section of the island with twelve subordinate bishops.

Æthelhard's successor was Wulfred, who fought with a later king of Mercia, Coenwulf, but the cause of contention is unknown. The king and archbishop were reconciled by 823, but by 827 the Kingdom of Wessex had conquered Kent and taken control of Canterbury from the Mercian kings. The archbishopric then lost influence in secular affairs due to the change in rulers. Wulfred died in March 832.

== Life ==
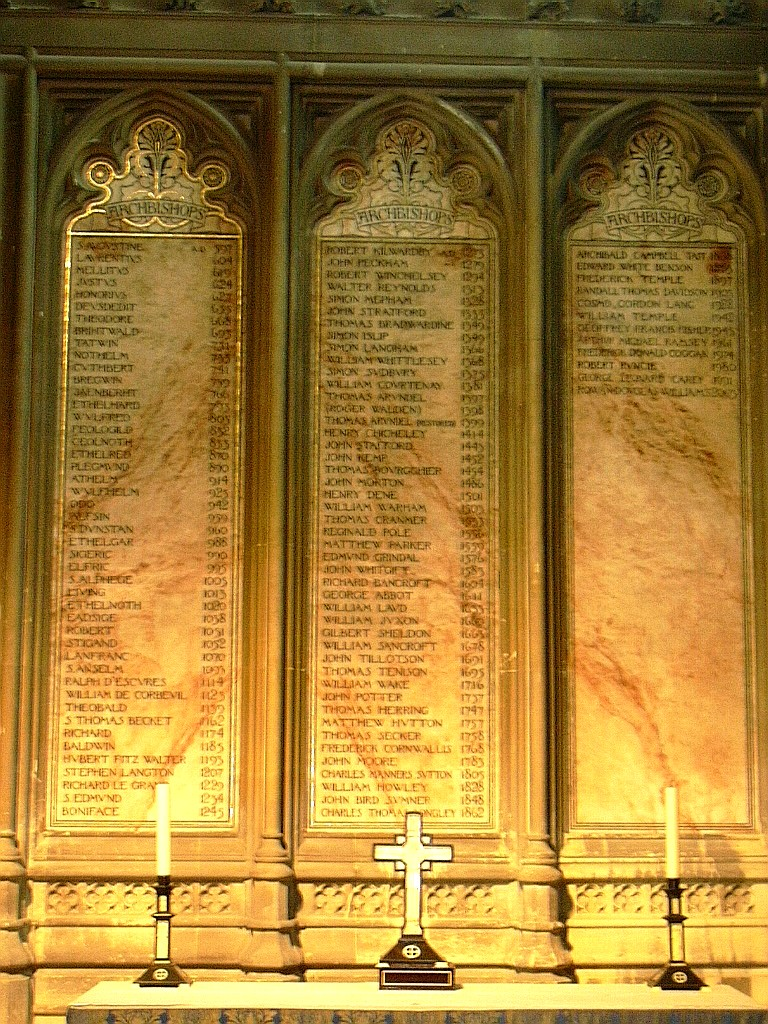
List of archbishops from Canterbury Cathedral, which lists Feologild almost half-way down the first panel.

Feologild attended the Council of Clovesho in 803, and was listed on the acts of that council as an abbot of a Kentish monastery.

According to the editors of the Handbook of British Chronology, he was elected to the see of Canterbury in early 832 and consecrated on 9 June 832, as a successor to Wulfred, although they qualify this statement with a "?" in their lists. The Handbook gives his successor as "Suithred", and note that he may have been a rival to Feologild. The historian Nicholas Brooks instead suggests that there was a disputed election after the death of Wulfred, and Feologild was one of the contenders. The historian Simon Keynes holds that the other contestant was Suithred (Swithred) who the historian William Hunt in the Oxford Dictionary of National Biography argues is identical with Feologild. Swithred is listed as archbishop in some early lists of the archbishops of Canterbury. The Anglican Church also considers him to be one of the archbishops of Canterbury, listing him as the 16th archbishop on their website.

While some documentation survives from Canterbury in the ninth century, including a number of charters from Feologild's predecessors and successors, the literary works from later periods that cover the period are prone to fabricating information to fill in gaps in the record.

Feologild died on 30 August 832, soon after his consecration, if in fact he was consecrated. The next archbishop was Ceolnoth, who worked to establish better relations with the monarchs of Wessex, apparently successfully. Another problem for Feologild's immediate successors as archbishop were Viking invasions, as Viking raids are attested in Kent from 835.

== Citations ==
Christian titles
Preceded by Wulfred	Archbishop of Canterbury; 832	Succeeded by Ceolnoth
