= Bregowine =

Archbishop of Canterbury from 760 to 764

Saint Bregowine
- Archbishop of Canterbury
- Appointed: 760
- Term ended: 764
- Predecessor: Cuthbert
- Successor: Jænberht

Orders
- Consecration: 27 September 761

Personal details
- Died: August 764
- Buried: Canterbury

Sainthood
- Feast day: 26 August
- Venerated in: Eastern Orthodox Church; Roman Catholic Church; Anglican Communion
- Canonized: Pre-Congregation

Bregowine (Note: Sometimes Bregwine or Bregwin) (died August 764) was a medieval Archbishop of Canterbury. Little is known of his origins or his activities as archbishop, although a number of stories were told about his possible origins after the Norman conquest in 1066. There are no records of him prior to his becoming archbishop. He possibly owed his elevation to the Kentish monarch. The records after his elevation to Canterbury are mainly about disputes over land, but knowledge of his time in office is hampered by the destruction of many of the contemporary records. After his death, he was considered a saint and a life about him was written in the 12th century.

== Life ==
Various stories have been told about Bregowine's origins, including that he was a nobleman and a continental Saxon who converted to Christianity and came to Canterbury because of the saintly reputation of Theodore of Tarsus. Others say that he owed his elevation to King Æthelbert II of Kent, but all these stories rest on works that were written after the Norman conquest of England in 1066. There are no contemporary records of Bregowine before he was archbishop. It does not appear, however, that he was of Mercian origins like his predecessors Tatwin and Nothhelm.

Whatever his upbringing, Bregowine was consecrated as archbishop on 27 September 761. His election took place in a brief period when Kent was free of Mercian dominance between 756 and 764, so the story that he owed his election to Æthelbert does fit with the time frame. He wrote letters to Archbishop Lul of Mainz which still exist, and which discuss an earlier meeting between the two men. Other activities as archbishop are recorded in surviving charters. One records that he protested at the loss of a church at Cookham that was confiscated by King Cynewulf of Wessex sometime after 760. Another surviving charter from Dunwald, a thegn of King Æthelbert, concerning land in Canterbury, records that Bregowine consented to the gift of land. Unfortunately, many of the early charters of the diocese of Canterbury are lost, which restricts knowledge of Bregowine's activities as archbishop.

Bregowine died in 764 and was originally buried in the baptistry in Canterbury, but his remains were moved to the choir of Canterbury Cathedral in 1123. This followed an attempt in around 1121 to remove his remains to another monastery, which came to nothing. The remains were placed by the altar of St Gregory in the south transept, after having been briefly placed in the north transept. Bregowine was later considered a saint, with a feast day of 26 August, although Florence of Worcester, a 12th-century writer, recorded his death date as 24 August. Other sources record the death date as 25 August. His life was later written by Eadmer in the 12th century.

== Citations ==
Christian titles
Preceded by Cuthbert	Archbishop of Canterbury; 760–764	Succeeded by Jænberht
