= Hunberght =

9th-century Bishop of Lichfield

- Bishop of Lichfield
- Appointed: 830
- Term ended: between 830 and 836
- Predecessor: Æthelwald
- Successor: Cynefrith

Orders
- Consecration: 830

Personal details
- Died: between 830 and 836

Hunberght (or Hunbeorht; died c. 833) was a medieval Bishop of Lichfield.

Hunberght was consecrated in 830 and died sometime between 830 and 836.

== Citations ==
Christian titles
Preceded by Æthelwald	Bishop of Lichfield; 830–c. 833	Succeeded by Cynefrith
