= Roger de Bailleul =

12th-century abbot and Archbishop of Canterbury-elect (died 1179)

- Archbishop-elect of Canterbury
- Elected: February 1173
- Predecessor: Thomas Becket
- Successor: Richard of Dover
- Other post: Abbot of Bec

Personal details
- Died: 25 September 1179 Bec Abbey, Normandy

Roger de Bailleul (French: [ʁɔʒe də bajøl]; died 25 September 1179) was a medieval Benedictine monk, abbot of Bec, and archbishop-elect of Canterbury.

Roger was born in Lombardy, but according to the Gallia Christiana, he was a native of Bailleul (although which one has not been identified), hence the name given to him. However, Robert du Mont confirms it was Lombardy.

Roger became a monk of the Abbey of Our Lady of Bec, Normandy and skilful jurist, teaching civil and canon law in England. As a supporter of the Empress Matilda against Stephen of Blois in the succession to the throne of England, he attracted royal opposition, and had to return to the abbey in Normandy.

After the death of Abbot Létard, Roger was elected the seventh abbot of Bec on 6 July 1149, and blessed by Archbishop Hugh of Rouen on 25 July 1149.

As the head of the rich Norman abbey, Roger began to renovate the abbey church, whose first stone was laid by Rotrou, Bishop of Évreux on 14 August 1161 and its consecration was celebrated in April 1178 before King Henry II of England. Roger also had a hospital built, which included one of the rooms for travellers, renovated the dormitory, and dug canals to carry water from two sources to the monastic apartments.

With the other bishops and abbots of Normandy, Roger attended the ceremony at Avranches of the absolution of King Henry II for the murder of Thomas Becket. In February 1173, Roger was elected to succeed as archbishop of Canterbury by the monks of Christ Church, Canterbury, but he declined the election. He was formally absolved from the election on 5 April 1173.

Roger died at Bec Abbey on 25 September 1179.

Catholic Church titles
Preceded by Létard	Abbot of Bec; 1149–1179	Succeeded by Osbern
Preceded by Thomas Becket (archbishop)	Archbishop-elect of Canterbury; 1173	Succeeded by Richard of Dover (archbishop)
