= Æthelwold (bishop of Lichfield) =

9th-century Bishop of Lichfield

- Bishop of Lichfield
- Appointed: 818
- Term ended: 830
- Predecessor: Herewine
- Successor: Hunberght

Orders
- Consecration: 818

Personal details
- Died: 830

Æthelwold (or Æthelweald; died 830) was a medieval Bishop of Lichfield.

Æthelwald was consecrated in 818 and died in 830.

== Citations ==
Christian titles
Preceded by Herewine	Bishop of Lichfield; 818–830	Succeeded by Hunberght
