= Ealdwulf of Lichfield =

9th-century Bishop of Lichfield

Ealdwulf
- Bishop of Lichfield
- Appointed: between 799 and 801
- Term ended: between 814 and 816
- Predecessor: Hygeberht
- Successor: Herewine

Orders
- Consecration: between 799 and 801

Personal details
- Died: between 814 and 816

Ealdwulf (Note: Or Aldwulf, Aldulf, or Adulphus) (died c. 815) was a medieval Bishop of Lichfield.

Ealdwulf was consecrated between 799 and 801 and died between 814 and 816. The historian D. P. Kirby speculates that the last act of his predecessor, Hygeberht, was to consecrate Ealdwulf, before Hygeberht resigned his archbishopric of Lichfield.

== Citations ==
Christian titles
Preceded by Hygeberht	Bishop of Lichfield c. 800–c. 815	Succeeded by Herewine
