= Domnus Apostolicus =

Epithet or title historically applied to popes

Domnus apostolicus, contraction of dominus apostolicus (Latin for 'apostolic lord', in a literal translation), is an epithet or title historically applied to popes, especially from the 6th to the 11th centuries, and was sometimes applied to other bishops also.

20th-century English translations of the phrase in the Litany of the Saints use the term "apostolic prelate". The sense-for-sense translation of the term "prelate" shifted in the same Litany of the Saints to "pope" since at least Pope John XXIII's 1959 encyclical Grata recordatio.

== Domnus ==
The word domnus is a shortened form of Latin dominus (lord). While the full form dominus is applied even to God and Jesus Christ, the shortened form is used only of human rulers, ecclesiastical or lay. For example, in Annales Loiseliani events concerning Tassilo III, Duke of Bavaria, Charlemagne and Pope Hadrian I are referred to as rex (king) and apostolicus (apostolic), and as domnus rex and domnus apostolicus. Domnus is used in ecclesiastical Latin as a generic title for a superior. For example, where, in the official English translation of the General Instruction of the Roman Missal (GIRM), 175, the deacon who is about to read the Gospel requests the presiding priest's blessing, saying in a low voice: "Your blessing, Father"; what he says in the Latin text of the General Instruction, 175 is: Iube, domne, benedicere (not domine).

A similar usage survives in the honorific Don, in Italian and Spanish, and Dom, in French and Portuguese.

Umberto Benigni wrote, in Catholic Encyclopedia, that "perhaps the only example" of the use of domnus apostolicus by Greek authors is the second letter from Theodore the Studite to Leo III, kyrio apostoliko.

== Apostolicus ==
The pope is described by the nominalized adjective apostolicus (apostolic), because he occupies an apostolic see. Since the Holy See (or Roman See) is the apostolic see in Western Christianity, sedes apostolica meant simply the Roman See, and domnus apostolicus the bishop of Rome. Claude of Turin "gives a curious explanation" as meaning apostoli custos, – a custodian of the apostle.

A list of popes compiled during the papacy of Pope Vigilius (r. 537–555) begins: Incipiunt nomina Apostolicorum ("Here begin the names of the Apostolics").

The title of apostolicus is also used in the acts of the Second Anglo-Saxon Council of Cloveshoo, in 747, for Pope Zachary and recurs frequently in documents of the Carolingian kings. There are also the expression apostolicatus ("apostolicate" = pontificate) and the ablative absolute apostolicante ("during the apostolicate/pontificate of").

In Gaul the term sedes apostolica (apostolic see) was used, as early as the 5th century, to describe any episcopal see, even if not founded by an apostle. By the 6th century, the term was in general use, and letters addressed by the Merovingian royalty to Gallic bishops collectively begin with Domnis sanctis et apostolica sede dignissimis ("To the holy lords most worthy of their apostolic seat") and the title domnus apostolicus continued to be applied to individual bishops in the time of Charlemagne, as in a letter of introduction that he gave to the papal legate Boniface. Benigni explains this usage is based on the bishops being successors of the apostles. And although in the 9th century the title became reserved to popes even in the Frankish empire, there are traces of its former use even in the 11th century: the Council of Rheims (1049) excommunicated Cresconius, bishop of Iria Flavia, quia contra fas sibi vendicaret culmen apostolici nominis (because he wrongly claimed the prestige of an apostolic name for himself), thinking of himself as the successor of Saint James the Greater, and the council declared quod solus Romanus Pontifex universalis Ecclesiae primas esset et apostolicus (that only the Roman pontiff was primate of the universal Church and apostolicus).

== See also ==
- Papal titles
- Apostolic Prefect
- Apostolic Vicar
- Apostolic Exarch
- Apostolic Administrator
