= Herewine =

9th-century Bishop of Lichfield

- Bishop of Lichfield
- Appointed: between 814 and 816
- Term ended: between 817 and 818
- Predecessor: Aldwulf
- Successor: Æthelwald

Orders
- Consecration: between 814 and 816

Personal details
- Died: between 817 and 818

Herewine (or Herewin; died c. 817) was a medieval Bishop of Lichfield.

Herewine was consecrated between 814 and 816 and died between 817 and 818.

== Citations ==
Christian titles
Preceded by Aldwulf	Bishop of Lichfield c. 815–c. 817	Succeeded by Æthelwald
