= Tunberht =

9th-century Bishop of Lichfield

- Bishop of Lichfield
- Appointed: between 841 and 845
- Term ended: between 857 and 862
- Predecessor: Cynefrith
- Successor: Wulfsige

Orders
- Consecration: between 841 and 845

Personal details
- Died: between 857 and 862

Tunberht (Note: Sometimes Tunbeorht, Tunbriht, Tunbright, Tunfrith, or Tumfriht) (died c. 860) was a medieval Bishop of Lichfield.

Tunberht was consecrated between 841 and 845 and died between 857 and 862.

== Citations ==
Christian titles
Preceded by Cynefrith	Bishop of Lichfield c. 843–c. 860	Succeeded by Wulfsige
