= Cynefrith =

9th-century Bishop of Lichfield

- Bishop of Lichfield
- Appointed: between 830 and 836
- Term ended: between 841 and 845
- Predecessor: Hunberght
- Successor: Tunberht

Orders
- Consecration: between 830 and 836

Personal details
- Died: between 841 and 845

Cynefrith (Note: Or Cyneferth or Cumbert) (died c. 843) was a medieval Bishop of Lichfield.

Cynefrith was consecrated between 830 and 836 and died between 841 and 845.

== Citations ==
Christian titles
Preceded by Hunberght	Bishop of Lichfield c. 833–c. 843	Succeeded by Tunberht
