= Councils of Clovesho =

The Councils of Clovesho or Clofesho were a series of synods attended by Anglo-Saxon kings, bishops, abbots and nobles in the 8th and 9th centuries. They took place at an unknown location in the Kingdom of Mercia.

== Location ==
The location of the place-name Clovesho has never been conclusively identified. Scholars believe that Clovesho must have been located in the kingdom of Mercia, or close to it, and close enough to the sees of the southern English bishops to travel to. It has been described by Catherine Cubitt as ‘the most famous lost place in Anglo-Saxon England’.

The placename, given by Bede as clofeshoch, is Old English. The first element is clof, a variant of cleófa, ‘a cleft, a chasm’, while the second is hóh, ‘a heel-shaped spur of land’. The modifier, clóf, is a rare word in place-names, Clovelly being the only other certain example of its use in a toponym. On the other hand, hóh is more common, with the densest concentration in the south-east Midlands. This pattern suggests that the place ought to lie within south-eastern Mercia, as has been deduced from the historical evidence.

The current favourite candidate for the location of Clovesho is Brixworth in Northamptonshire, where the surviving Anglo-Saxon church of All Saints' Church, Brixworth is indicative of the importance of the settlement during the Anglo-Saxon period. Previously suggested locations have included Cliffe (formerly called Cliffe-at-Hoo), Abingdon and Tewkesbury (which were considered by Arthur West Haddan and William Stubbs to be based upon unreliable evidence). More recently, Clifford Offer has suggested Hitchin in Hertfordshire, while Keith Bailey has proposed Royston, also in Hertfordshire, Dunstable in Bedfordshire and somewhere near Hertford itself.

The dates of several Councils are known, although some references are thought to be spurious, including one mentioned in the endorsement of a fraudulent charter in the name of Wihtred of Kent dated 716, and another of 742 by Æthelred of Mercia. Those Councils for which evidence thought to be authentic exists are those of 747, 793×6, 794, 798, 803, 804(?), 824 and 825.

== The purpose and nature of the councils ==
When Archbishop Theodore of Tarsus held the Council of Hertford in 672 or 673, he declared to the assembled bishops that he had been "appointed by the Apostolic See to be Bishop of the Church of Canterbury". A canon was passed to the effect that in future yearly synods should be held on 1 August every year "in the place which is called Clofeshoch". Meetings were held at Clovesho for more than 150 years.

The councils at Clovesho, and those generally of the Anglo-Saxon period, were mixed assemblies which included bishops, abbots, the king of Mercia and the chief men of his kingdom. The councils had the character not only of a church synod but of the Witenagemot, an assembly of the ruling class whose primary function was to advise the king. The affairs of the Church were decided by the bishops, who were in turn presided over by the archbishop. The king presided over his chiefs and gave his authority to their decisions. There is no evidence of any royal interference in the spiritual legislation or judgments of the Church.

At the time of the councils of Clovesho, England was not yet united into one kingdom. Based on the signatures on surviving documents, however, the bishop of Canterbury and all prelates south of the Humber attended the councils.

Seventy years after the Hertford council, the first Council of Clovesho of which we have an authentic record was held. The Canterbury Cartulary contained a charter stating that in 716 the privilege of Wihtred to the churches was "confirmed and ratified in a synod held in the month of July in a place called Clovesho". Historians Arthur West Haddan and William Stubbs have questioned the authenticity of this document.

== The Council of 742 ==
The first Council of Clovesho was presided over by Æthelbald of Mercia and Archbishop Cuthbert of Canterbury. According to the record of its proceedings, the council "diligently enquired into the needs of religion, the Creed as delivered by the ancient teaching of the Fathers, and carefully examined how things were ordered at the first beginning of the Church here in England, and where the honour of the monasteries according to the rules of justice was maintained". The privilege of Wihtred, which assured the liberty of the Church, was solemnly confirmed. No other provisions were mentioned.

== The Council of 747 ==
The second Council of Clovesho was one of the most important such gatherings recorded in the history of the Anglo-Saxon Church. Its acts were copied by Spelman from an ancient Cottonian manuscript, which is now lost.

The acts state that the Council was composed of "bishops and dignitaries of less degree from the various provinces of Britain" and that it was presided over by Archbishop Cuthbert. According to a manuscript preserved by William of Malmesbury, "King Ethelbald and his princes and chiefs were present".

The Acts related that "first of all, the Metropolitan, as president, brought forth in their midst two letters of the Apostolic Lord, Pope Zachary, venerated throughout the whole world, and with great care these were plainly read, and also openly translated into our own language, according as he himself by his Apostolic authority had commanded". The papal letters are described as containing a fervent admonition, addressed to the English people of every rank and condition, and stated that those who condemned these warnings and remained obstinate in their malice should be punished by sentence of excommunication. The council then drew up thirty-one canons, the majority of which dealt with matters of ecclesiastical discipline and liturgy.

The thirteenth and fifteenth canons are noteworthy as showing the close union of the Anglo-Saxon Church with the Holy See. The thirteenth canon stated that

[A]ll the most sacred Festivals of Our Lord made Man, in all things pertaining to the same, viz.: in the Office of Baptism, the celebration of Masses, in the method of chanting, shall be celebrated in one and the same way, namely, according to the sample which we have received in writing from the Roman Church. And also, throughout the course of the whole year, the festivals of the Saints are to be kept on one and the same day, with their proper psalmody and chant, according to the Martyrology of the same Roman Church.

The fifteenth canon adds that in the seven hours of the daily and nightly Office the clergy "must not dare to sing or read anything not sanctioned by the general use, but only that which comes down by authority of Holy Scripture, and which the usage of the Roman Church allows".

Other canons required that the litanies and rogations were to be observed by the clergy and people with great reverence "according to the rite of the Roman Church". The feasts of St. Gregory and of St. Augustine, "who was sent to the English people by our said Pope and father St. Gregory", were to be solemnly celebrated. The clergy and monks were to live so as to be always prepared to receive worthily the most holy Body and Blood of the Lord, and the laity were to be exhorted to the practice of frequent Communion. Persons who did not know Latin were to join in the psalmody by intention, and were to be taught to say prayers for the living or for the repose of the souls of the dead in English. Neither clergy nor monks were to be allowed to live in the houses of the people, nor were they to adopt or imitate the dress which is worn by the laity.

== The Council of 794 ==
The record of the third Council of Clovesho is a charter by which Offa of Mercia made a grant of land for pious purposes. The charter stated that it has been drawn up "in the general synodal Council in the most celebrated place called Clofeshoas".

Around the time when the papal legates presided at the Council of Chelsea in 787, Offa had obtained from Pope Adrian I that a new archbishopric should be created at Lichfield and that the Mercian sees should be subjected to its jurisdiction and withdrawn from that of Canterbury. Consequently, at this Council of 794, Higbert of Lichfield, to whom the pope had sent the pallium, signed as an archbishop.

== The Council of 798 ==
A council was held at Clovesho in 798 by Archbishop Ethelheard with Coenwulf of Mercia, at which the bishops and abbots and chief men of the province were present. Its proceedings are related in a document by Archbishop Ethelheard, who stated that his first care was to examine diligently "in what way the Catholic Faith was held and how the Christian religion was practised amongst them". To this inquiry, "they all replied with one voice: 'Be it known to your Paternity, that even as it was formerly delivered to us by the Holy Roman and Apostolic See, by the mission of the most Blessed Pope Gregory, so do we believe, and what we believe, we in all sincerity do our best to put into practice.'"

The Council also devoted time in dealing with questions of church property, and producing an agreement of exchange of lands between the archbishop and the Abbess Cynethryth.

== The Council of 803 ==
The fifth Council of Clovesho was one of the most remarkable of the series, as its Acts contained the declaration of the restitution of the Mercian sees to the province of Canterbury by the authority of Pope Leo III.

In 798, Coenwulf of Mercia addressed to the pope a long letter, representing "with great affection and humility" the disadvantages of the new archbishopric at Lichfield that had been created eleven years before by Pope Adrian I. In the letter the king submitted the whole case to the pope, asking his blessing and saying: "I love you as one who is my father, and I embrace you with the whole strength of my obedience", and promising to abide in all things by his decision. "I judge it fitting to bend humbly the ear of our obedience to your holy commands, and to fulfil with all our strength whatever may seem to your Holiness that we ought to do."

Æthelhard, Archbishop of Canterbury, travelled to Rome to plead for the restitution of the sees. In 802, Leo granted the petition of the king and the archbishop and issued to the latter a Papal bull in which he restored to him the full jurisdiction enjoyed by his predecessors. The pope communicated this judgment in a letter to Coenwulf.

This decision was duly proclaimed in the Council of Clovesho held in the following year. Archbishop Ethelheard declared to the synod that "by the co-operation of God and of the Apostolic Lord, the Pope Leo", he and his fellow-bishops unanimously ratified the rights of the See of Canterbury, and that an archbishopric should never more be founded at Lichfield, and that the grant of the pallium made "with the consent and permission of the Apostolic Lord Pope Adrian, be considered as null, having been obtained surreptitiously and by evil suggestion". After Higbert, the Archbishop of Lichfield, submitted to the papal judgment and retired to a monastery, the Mercian sees returned to the jurisdiction of Canterbury.

== Further synods ==
In 824 and 825 two further synods were held at Clovesho, "Beornwulf, King of Mercia, presiding and the Venerable Archbishop Wulfred ruling and controlling the Synod", according to the record of the first, and "Wulfred the Archbishop presiding, and also Beornwulf, King of Mercia", according to the second. The first assembly was occupied in deciding a suit concerning an inheritance and the second in terminating a dispute between the archbishop and the Abbess Cynethryth.

== See also ==
- History of the Church of England
