= Synod of Chelsea =

There were a number of Synods of Chelsea held in Anglo-Saxon England. They were held at Cealchythe, (Note: Also called Celchyth, Calchut, Celicyth.) in Kent, generally identified with modern Chelsea, London.

== Offa's councils ==
=== 787 ===
King Offa of Mercia presided over a church council held at Chelsea in the 787. Although it has often been claimed that the council was attended by papal legates, this stems from a conflation of the visit by papal legates to Offa's court and Northumbria in 786. The two legates did attend a council held at Offa's court, but this was not necessarily held at Chelsea.

Two different versions of the Anglo-Saxon Chronicle record the proceedings of the council. The Peterborough Manuscript (Version E) of the Chronicle records the council under the year 785, although the events took place in 787, and states that "here there was a contentious synod at Chelsea and Archbishop Jænberht relinquished some part of his bishopric, and Hygeberht was chosen by King Offa, and Ecgfrith consecrated as king." The Canterbury Manuscript (Version F) has the council under 785 also, and describes the council as "a full synod sat at Chelsey" but otherwise relates much the same events. The historian Nicholas Brooks sees the coupling of the elevation of Lichfield with the consecration of Ecgfrith, who was Offa's son, as significant. He argues that Offa desired to have Ecgfrith consecrated as his successor during Offa's lifetime, but was unable to get Jænberht to agree, and this was another factor in the creation of Lichfield as an archbishopric. Hygeberht consecrated Ecgfrith after Hygeberht's elevation to archiepiscopal status.

Offa vowed at the council to donate 365 mancuses each year to the papacy, to provide for poor people in Rome and to provide lights for St. Peter's Basilica, stated to be a thanks-offering for his victories. C. J. Godfrey has argued that the donation was really in return for the papal approval of Offa's scheme to elevate the diocese of Lichfield to an archdiocese. Whatever Offa's motivation, historians have generally seen the gift as the beginning of Peter's Pence, an annual "tax" paid to Rome by the English Church.

Although it appears that the 787 council approved Lichfield's elevation to an archdiocese, Hygeberht, who was present, remained a bishop at its conclusion; he signed the council's report still as a bishop. There is no indication that he played any significant part in the council nor in the actions that led to him becoming an archbishop.

=== 789 ===
Another council was held at Chelsea in 789, and a surviving charter records some of the attending bishops. These included both the Archbishop of Canterbury and the Archbishop of Lichfield, as well as the Bishops of Dunwich, Leicester, Lindsey, and Winchester.

=== 793 ===
Although a charter exists claiming that there was a council at Chelsea in 793, the charter itself (Sawyer 136) is a forgery, and likely put together from a list of bishops alive at that date.

== 801 ==
A council appears to have been held at Chelsea in 801, as an extant charter (Sawyer 158) records a confirmation of a land grant by Coenwulf, the king of Mercia that was part of the council's proceedings.

== 816 ==
There was a further synod in Chelsea in 816. Called by Coenwulf of Mercia, it limited the power of Archbishop Wulfred. It also ruled on baptism, relics. (Note: "When relics of the saints could not be procured, consecrated Hosts and fragments of the Gospels were sometimes used; concerning the use of the former for this purpose the English Synod of Calchut (Celicyth, Chelsea, 816) made a regulation (can. 22).") and church property.

The canons of this council are still extant, as British Library manuscript Cotton Vespasian A xiv.
