= Cuthbert of Canterbury =

Archbishop of Canterbury from 740 to 760

Saint Cuthbert
- Archbishop of Canterbury
- Appointed: 740
- Term ended: 26 October 760
- Predecessor: Nothhelm
- Successor: Bregowine
- Other post: possibly Bishop of Hereford

Orders
- Consecration: 740

Personal details
- Born: unknown
- Died: 26 October 760
- Buried: Canterbury

Sainthood
- Feast day: 26 October
- Venerated in: Eastern Orthodox Church; Roman Catholic Church; Anglican Communion
- Canonized: Pre-Congregation

Cuthbert (died 26 October 760) was a medieval Anglo-Saxon Archbishop of Canterbury in England. Prior to his elevation to Canterbury, he was abbot of a monastic house, and perhaps may have been Bishop of Hereford also, but evidence for his holding Hereford mainly dates from after the Norman Conquest of England in 1066. While Archbishop, he held church councils and built a new church in Canterbury. It was during Cuthbert's archbishopric that the Diocese of York was raised to an archbishopric. Cuthbert died in 760 and was later regarded as a saint.

== Early life and Hereford ==
Of noble birth, Cuthbert is first recorded as the abbot of Lyminge Abbey, from where he was elevated to the see of Hereford in 736. The identification of the Cuthbert who was Bishop of Hereford with the Cuthbert who became archbishop, however, comes from Florence of Worcester and other post-Conquest sources. The contemporary record in the Anglo-Saxon Chronicle says that Cuthbert was consecrated archbishop, where if he had been Bishop of Hereford, he would have been translated. No consecration is needed when a bishop is translated from one see to another. Given the nature of the sources, the identification of the bishop of Hereford with the archbishop of Canterbury, while likely, must not be regarded as proven.

If Cuthbert was at Hereford, he served in that capacity for four years before his elevation to the See of Canterbury in 740. He is credited with the composition of an epitaph for the tomb of his three predecessors at Hereford. The cathedral church of the see may not even have been located at Hereford by Cuthbert's time.

Whoever Cuthbert was prior to his election to Canterbury, he probably owed his selection as archbishop to the influence of Æthelbald, King of Mercia. A number of Mercians were appointed to Canterbury during the 730s and 740s, which suggests that Mercian authority was expanding into Kent.

== Canterbury ==
Cuthbert was the recipient of a long letter from Boniface who complained about the lax morals of the clergy in the British Isles, and too much drinking of alcohol by the Anglo-Saxon bishops. Cuthbert also sent letters to Lull who was Archbishop of Mainz and a native of England. During Cuthbert's time as archbishop he no longer claimed authority over all of Britain, like his predecessor Theodore. Pope Gregory III in 735 had sent a pallium to the bishop of York, raising the see of York to the status of an archbishopric. As a sign of the enhanced status of York, Cuthbert only consecrated bishops south of the Humber and his synods were attended only by bishops from the south of England.

Cuthbert presided over the Council of Clovesho in 747 along with Æthelbald of Mercia. This gathering mandated that all clergy should explain the basic tenets of Christianity to the laity, as well as legislating on clerical dress, control of monasteries, and the behavior of the clergy. It also mandated that each diocese hold a synod to proclaim the decisions of the council. Cuthbert sent his deacon Cynebert to Pope Gregory III after the council with a report on the council and its resolutions. This action may have been taken in response to Boniface's complaints about Cuthbert and Æthelbald to the papacy. The actions of the council were also gathered into a collection at Cuthbert's command.

After the council, Cuthbert continued to correspond with Boniface up until Boniface's martyrdom in 754, and then sent condolences to Boniface's successor. Cuthbert held a second synod in 758, but nothing is known of any enactments it made. He also built the church of St. John the Baptist in Canterbury, which was destroyed by fire in 1067. He was buried in his new church. The new church was located on the west side of the cathedral, and was used as a baptistery. The church also became a burial site for many of the archbishops, and later was used for trials by ordeal. There is no explicit contemporary reference that states that these uses were intended by Cuthbert, but the fact that the church was dedicated to St. John the Baptist argues strongly that Cuthbert at least intended the new building as a baptistery.

The burial practices of the archbishops did change after Cuthbert, but it is not clear whether this was intended by Cuthbert, as a Post-Conquest Canterbury cartulary has it, or due to other reasons, unconnected with Cuthbert. Although Sonia Hawkes argues that the change in burial customs, which extended over most of Britain, resulted from Cuthbert's mandating burial in churchyards, instead of outside the city limits as had been the custom previously. However, the main evidence for this theory is a 16th-century tradition at Canterbury and the archaeological evidence of a change in burial patterns. Although a change did occur, the archaeological evidence does not give a reason why this change happened, and given the late date of the Canterbury tradition, the theory cannot be considered proven.

== Death and legacy ==
Cuthbert died on 26 October 760, and was later considered a saint with a feast day of 26 October. He was buried in his church of St. John, and was the first Archbishop of Canterbury that was not buried in St Augustine's Abbey. His letters to the Anglo-Saxon missionaries on the European continent show him to have been highly educated.

== Citations ==
Christian titles
Preceded by Walhstod	Bishop of Hereford; 736–740	Succeeded by Podda
Preceded by Nothelm	Archbishop of Canterbury; 740–760	Succeeded by Bregowine
