= John of Sittingbourne =

13th-century Archbishop-elect of Canterbury

- Archbishop of Canterbury-elect
- Elected: 16 March 1232
- Quashed: 12 June 1232
- Predecessor: Ralph Neville
- Successor: John Blund
- Other post: Prior of Christ Church

Orders
- Consecration: never consecrated

Personal details
- Died: before 1238

John of Sittingbourne (died before 1238) was Archbishop of Canterbury-elect in 1232.

John was a monk of Christ Church Priory, Canterbury, and was selected as prior of Christ Church in 1222. John was elected to the archbishopric on 16 March 1232, but his election was quashed on 12 June 1232 when he resigned the office at the papal court.

John died sometime before 1238.

== Citations ==
Catholic Church titles
Preceded by Ralph Neville	Archbishop of Canterbury election quashed 1232–1232	Succeeded by John Blund
