= Richard of Dover =

Archbishop of Canterbury from 1173 to 1184

- Archbishop of Canterbury
- Appointed: 3 June 1173
- Term ended: 16 February 1184
- Predecessor: Roger de Bailleul
- Successor: Baldwin of Forde
- Other post: Prior of Dover Priory

Orders
- Consecration: 7 April 1174 by Pope Alexander III

Personal details
- Died: 16 February 1184 Halling, Kent
- Buried: Canterbury Cathedral

Richard (died 16 February 1184) was a medieval Benedictine monk and Archbishop of Canterbury. Employed by Thomas Becket immediately before Becket's death, Richard arranged for Becket to be buried in Canterbury Cathedral and eventually succeeded Becket at Canterbury in a contentious election. Much of Richard's time as archbishop was spent in a dispute with Roger de Pont L'Evêque, the Archbishop of York, over the primacy of England, and with St Augustine's Abbey in Canterbury over the archbishop's jurisdiction over the abbey. Richard had better relations with King Henry II of England than Becket had and was employed by the king on diplomatic affairs. Richard also had the trust of the papacy and served as a judge for it. Several of his questions to Pope Alexander III were collected into the Decretals, a collection of ecclesiastical laws, and his patronage of canon lawyers did much to advance the study of canon law in England.

== Early life ==
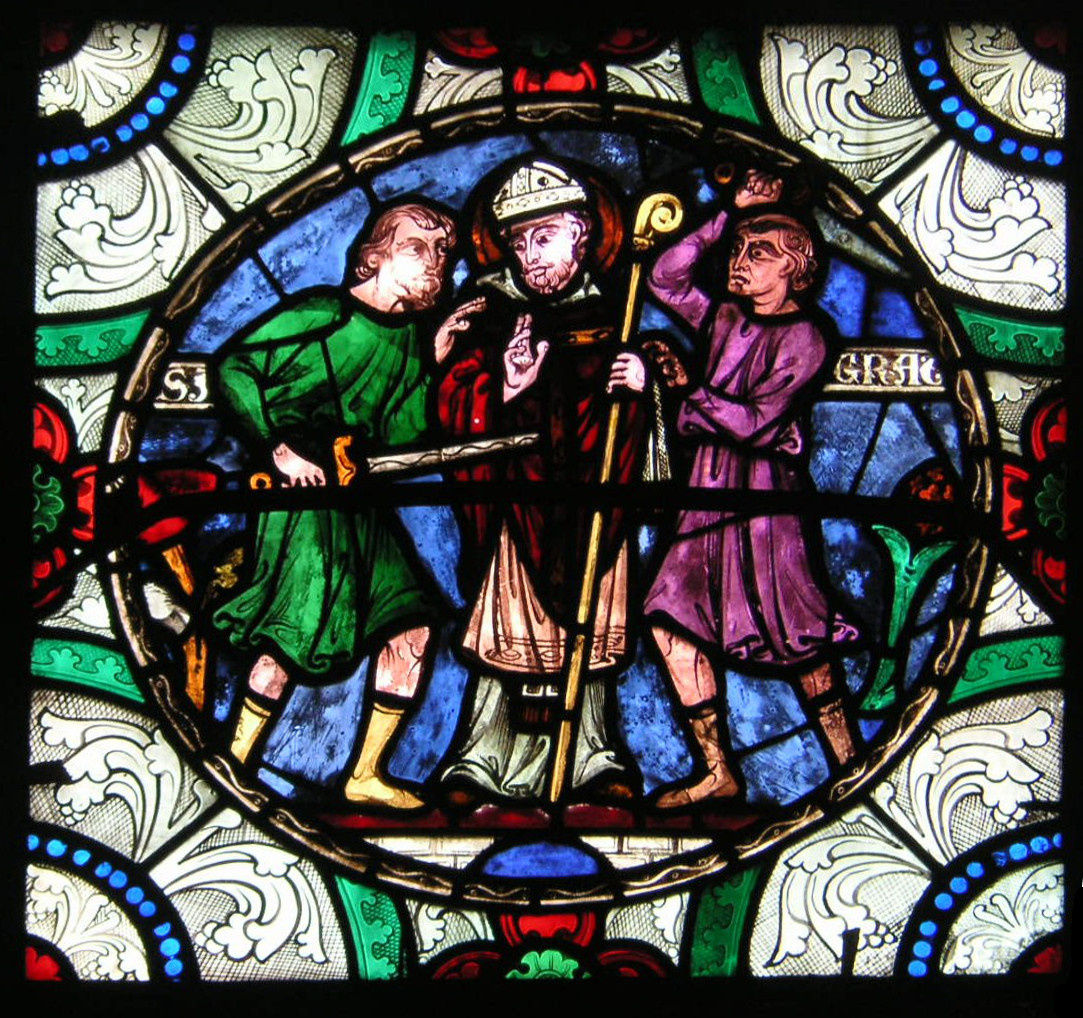
A stained glass window in Cantnerbury Cathedral depicting the murder of Thomas Becket.

Richard was born in Normandy and became a monk at Canterbury, and a chaplain to Theobald of Bec, the Archbishop of Canterbury. At some point, he received an education, but it is not known where or who he studied with. The first notice of him in history is as a monk at Christ Church. He was a colleague of Thomas Becket while they both worked for Theobald. In 1157, he was appointed prior of St. Martin's priory in Dover. St. Martin's was a Benedictine priory and a dependent house of Christ Church Cathedral Priory in Canterbury, the cathedral chapter of the archbishops of Canterbury. Right before Becket's death Becket employed Richard to meet with Henry the Young King, but was unsuccessful in the attempt. After Becket's death, Richard took charge of Becket's body and arranged for immediate burial in Canterbury Cathedral.

== Archbishop ==
In 1173, more than two years after the murder of Becket, King Henry II of England decided to fill the vacant archbishopric of Canterbury; there were two candidates: Richard and Odo, prior of Canterbury. Previously, Roger, the abbot of Bec Abbey, had been elected but refused the office. On 3 June 1173, Richard was chosen, although the monks preferred Odo. Both sides appealed to Rome, and Richard journeyed to Rome with Reginald fitz Jocelin, who had recently been elected Bishop of Bath, to rebut the charges of simony, illegitimate birth, and swearing an oath to the king that had been raised. After hearing the charges, they were dismissed, and the election was ratified on 2 April 1174; on 7 April 1174 the new archbishop was consecrated at Anagni by Pope Alexander III. Richard returned to England at the close of the year bearing his pallium which he had received directly from the pope. He was also granted legatine powers by Alexander III.

Richard clashed with Roger de Pont L'Evêque, the Archbishop of York, over the respective rights of the two sees throughout his time as archbishop. In 1175, at a council held in London, there was a fight between their supporters. King Henry II secured a truce between the archbishops for five years, but Richard was soon embroiled in another dispute. This one was with Roger, abbot of St Augustine's Abbey in Canterbury, and revolved around whether or not the abbey depended directly on the pope or if the archbishop had jurisdictional rights over the abbey. In the end, the papacy arranged a settlement that left the abbey dependent on the pope directly, but gave the archbishop spiritual authority over the churches of the Isle of Thanet, which the abbey had previously held.

Richard's time as archbishop was much less stormy than Becket's had been, and he seems to have had better relations with the king. Richard attended the royal councils and was with the king in Normandy more than once. Richard was less dogmatic on the rights of the clergy than his great predecessor had been; but his compromises were regarded by the monastic writers and the followers of Becket as a sign of weakness. Pope Alexander III took Richard to task when Richard acquiesced in the election of bishops in the royal chapel. As part of his diplomatic efforts on the king's behalf, Richard escorted Henry's daughter Joan to Provence on her journey in 1176 to marry King William II of Sicily. Richard also spent part of 1177 in Flanders on diplomatic business for King Henry.

== Patronage, death, and legacy ==
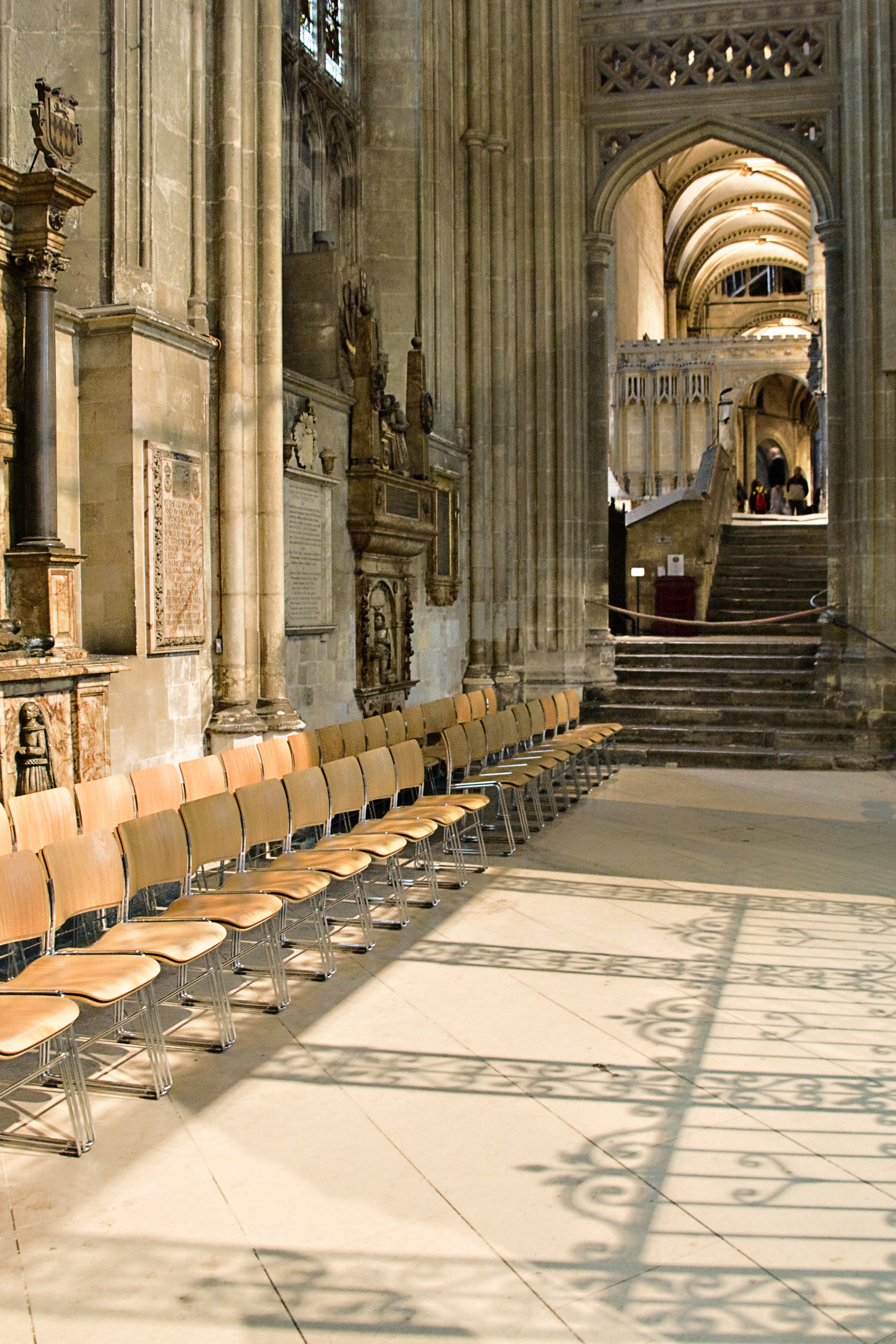
Burial site of Richard of Dover in the north aisle of the nave of Canterbury Cathedral

Richard attracted canon lawyers to his household, including Gerard la Pucelle, Peter of Blois, and Henry Pium of Northampton, all of whom advised him on legal matters. At the Council of Westminster that Richard convened in May 1175, nineteen canons were put forth, dealing with clerical marriage, the oversupply of ordained clergy, the behaviour of the clergy and their dress and tonsure, and simony. Another canon dealt with clandestine marriages and regulated child marriages. He was also heavily involved with trying judicial cases, both in the actual judgment and in the execution of judgments made by others. Four of his questions to Alexander III entered the Decretals and the other collections of canon law of the 13th century.

Richard died at Halling, Kent on 16 February 1184 of colic and was buried in his cathedral. A. L. Poole, the historian, felt that Richard was a "feeble and ineffective person." Frank Barlow, another historian, calls him a "blameless mediocrity". Richard of Ilchester, a fellow bishop, held that it was Richard of Dover's defects that prevented the English Church from profiting more from Becket's martyrdom. However, Richard did much to promote the use of canon law throughout England. Richard was also active in using his legatine powers to interfere in monastic affairs, deposing the abbot of Peterborough Abbey in 1175 and threatening to visit other monastic houses that were exempt from episcopal interference to regulate the monastic affairs. On a more domestic note, Richard was held to have been an able steward of the estates of Canterbury, very much interested in increasing production. He was held to be a pious and gentle man.

== Citations ==
Catholic Church titles
Preceded by Thomas Becket	Archbishop of Canterbury; 1174–1184	Succeeded by Baldwin of Forde
