= John Blund =

English philosopher and archbishop-elect of Canterbury (c.1175–1248)

- Archbishop of Canterbury-elect
- Elected: 26 August 1232
- Quashed: 1 June 1233
- Predecessor: John of Sittingbourne
- Successor: Edmund of Abingdon
- Other post: Chancellor of York

Orders
- Consecration: never consecrated

Personal details
- Born: c. 1175
- Died: 1248

John Blund (Note: Or Johannes Blund, Iohannes Blondus, Iohannes Blundus) (c. 1175–1248) was an English scholastic philosopher, known for his work on the nature of the soul, the Tractatus de anima, one of the first works of western philosophy to make use of the recently translated De Anima by Aristotle and especially the Persian philosopher Avicenna's work on the soul, also called De Anima. He taught at Oxford University along with Edmund of Abingdon. David Knowles said that he was "noteworthy for his knowledge of Avicenna and his rejection of the hylomorphism of Avicebron and the plurality of forms.", although the problem of the plurality of forms as understood by later scholastics was not formulated explicitly in Blund's time. Maurice Powicke calls him the "first English Aristotelian."

Blund was a royal clerk by 1227 and studied at Oxford and Paris, and was at the University of Paris when it was dispersed in 1229. He was a canon of Chichester before 1232. He was archbishop of Canterbury during a brief reign, having been elected on 26 August 1232. He was supported by Peter des Roches, but did not receive papal approval and the election was quashed because of alleged pluralism on 1 June 1233. Probably it was the support of des Roches that doomed his election to Canterbury, and the pluralism charge was cover for the real reason. He was appointed chancellor of the see of York before 3 November 1234, and died in 1248.

== Citations ==
Catholic Church titles
Preceded by John of Sittingbourne	Archbishop of Canterbury; Election quashed 1232	Succeeded by Edmund of Abingdon
