= Æthelred (archbishop of Canterbury) =

Archbishop of Canterbury from 870 to 888

- Archbishop of Canterbury
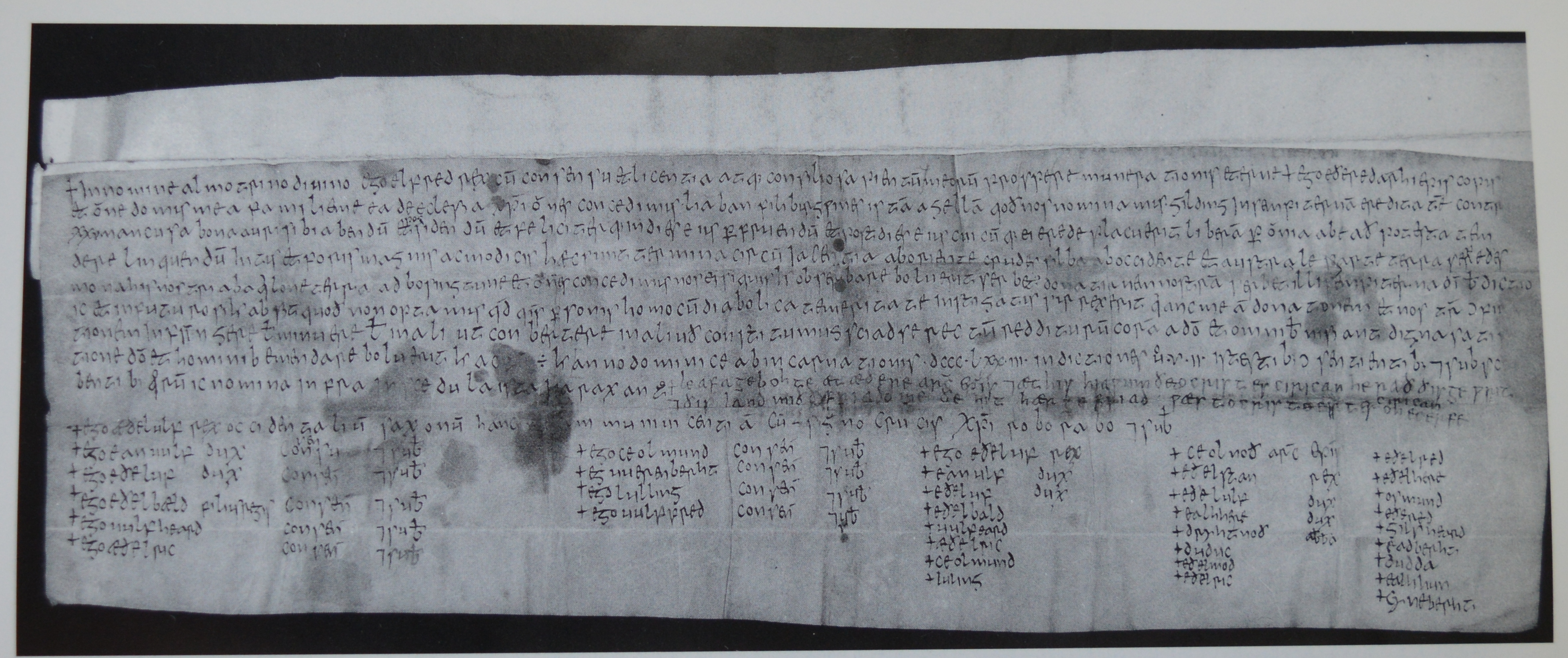
- This charter issued by Æthelred in 873 shows the poor standard of Latin at the start of Alfred the Great's reign
- Elected: 870
- Term ended: 30 June 888
- Predecessor: Ceolnoth
- Successor: Plegmund

Orders
- Consecration: 870

Personal details
- Died: 30 June 888

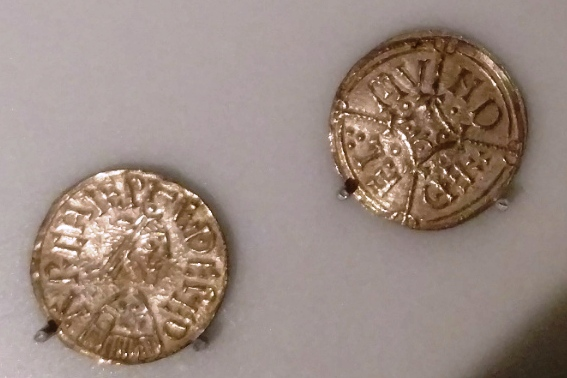
Coin of Æthelred, Cross and Lozenge type, minted 875-79

Æthelred (or Ethelred; died 30 June 888) was an Anglo-Saxon Archbishop of Canterbury in medieval England. Although one source states that he was Bishop of Wiltshire prior to his elevation to Canterbury, this has been shown to be false. Much of Æthelred's time in office was spent dealing with the dislocations caused by the invasion of England by Vikings. There were also conflicts with King Alfred the Great over ecclesiastical matters as well as the desire of the papacy to reform the English clergy.

== Biography ==
Some sources, including the Anglo-Saxon Chronicle, in the F version of that work, state that Æthelred was transferred in 870 from the Bishopric of Wiltshire to the see of Canterbury. However, the transfer has now been proven to be taken from the life of Ælfric of Abingdon, who was archbishop from 995 to 1005. Although the story of his transfer is false, Æthelred was consecrated as archbishop in 870. Why he was selected for Canterbury is unknown, as there is no contemporary information on his election.

Most of Æthelred's time as archbishop was spent dealing with the effects of Viking raids, but he also had a conflict with King Alfred the Great over royal control of ecclesiastical affairs. It was during Æthelred's archbishopric that the Golden Gospels, a still-surviving 8th century gospel book, was ransomed from a raiding army and donated to Canterbury. Pope John VIII also urged Æthelred and Archbishop Wulfhere of York to reform the dress of the English clergy. The Anglo-Saxon clergy wore the short tunic that was the normal costume of the laypeople of Britain. The Roman custom, however, was to wear long clerical robes or habits, and the Anglo-Saxon custom was opposed by the papacy and other continental clergy. Whether Æthelred and Wulfred took steps to try to change the dress of their clergy is unknown, but the clothing customs of the Anglo-Saxon clergy did not change.

Around 877, Æthelred wrote to Pope John VIII to complain about King Alfred's conduct towards Canterbury. The exact nature of the dispute is not clear, but the reply from the pope to the archbishop still exists. The pope told the archbishop that Canterbury had papal support and that the pope had written to the king, urging the king to respect the rights of the archbishop. The writer Justin Pollard sees this letter as evidence of papal support for the deposition of Alfred, which Pollard alleges occurred at Christmas 878 and that the deposition was supported by Æthelred. Other historians, however, do not agree that there was a deposition of the king supported by the archbishop at this time.

Æthelred also reached an agreement with Ælfred, an ealdorman, where Ælfred was granted the life use of a Canterbury estate in return for bequeathing one of his estates to Canterbury after his death. The document that records this agreement is not dated, however, so it is unknown when exactly during Æthelred's episcopate the document was drawn up. Another problem for the archbishop was a decline in the abilities of the scribes at Canterbury, which is dramatically illustrated by the document, which has a number of errors and duplications. Other documents of the period show that some of the scribes had little knowledge of Latin.

Æthelred died 30 June 888.

== Citations ==
Christian titles
Preceded by Ceolnoth	Archbishop of Canterbury; 870–888	Succeeded by Plegmund
