= Wulfred =

Archbishop of Canterbury from 805 to 832

- Archbishop of Canterbury
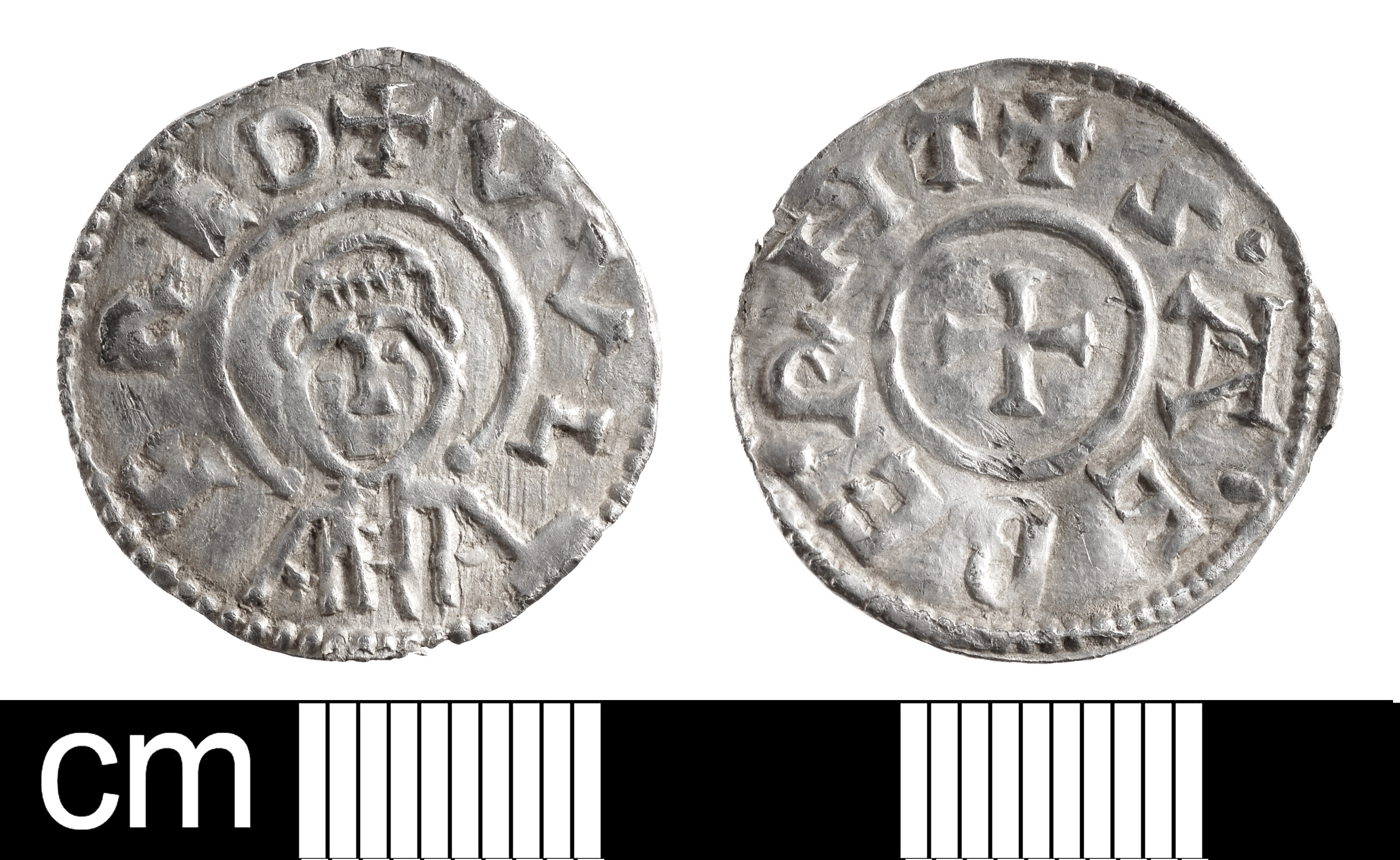
- Penny of Wulfred, Archbishop of Canterbury (c.823–825)
- Appointed: before August 805
- Term ended: 24 March 832
- Predecessor: Æthelhard
- Successor: Feologild

Orders
- Consecration: 3 August 805

Personal details
- Died: 24 March 832

Wulfred (died 24 March 832) was an Anglo-Saxon Archbishop of Canterbury in medieval England. Nothing is known of his life prior to 803, when he attended a church council, but he was probably a nobleman from Middlesex. He was elected archbishop in 805 and spent his time in office reforming the clergy of his cathedral. He also quarrelled with two consecutive Mercian kings – Coenwulf and Ceolwulf – over whether laymen or clergy should control monasteries. At one point, Wulfred travelled to Rome to consult with the papacy and was deposed from office for a number of years over the issue. After Coenwulf's death, relations were somewhat better with the new king Ceolwulf, but improved much more after Ceolwulf's subsequent deposition. The dispute about control of the monasteries was not fully settled until 838, after Wulfred's death. Wulfred was the first archbishop to place his portrait on the coinage he struck.

== Sources and early life ==
The main sources for Wulfred's life are the surviving charters which mention him, a number of documents from his suffragan bishops pledging obedience, the records of a church council he presided over, and the coinage he issued.

Wulfred is believed to have come from Middlesex and to have been a member of a wealthy and important family with considerable landholdings in Middlesex and neighbouring regions. Although earlier historians felt that Wulfred came from the Kentish nobility, it no longer appears that this was so. A kinsman, Werhard, owned property near Hayes, and Wulfred later owned property there also. Other evidence suggests that he was related to a noble family that owned lands in Harrow and Twickenham as well as Hayes.

Wulfred was archdeacon of the community at Christ Church, Canterbury before the death of his predecessor Æthelhard on 12 May 805. Wulfred attended a synod as a member of Æthelhard's staff in 803, but this is the first mention of Wulfred in the historical record. On 26 July 805, he attended a synod and was named "archbishop-elect" on the documents relating to the council decisions. Wulfred was consecrated archbishop on 3 August 805, or perhaps in October or later in 805. He may have owed his elevation to Canterbury to the fact that the kingdom of Mercia dominated Kent and Canterbury at this time.

== Reform of Christ Church ==
One of Wulfred's main objects as archbishop was the reformation of the cathedral chapter of Canterbury – that of Christ Church. A main tenet was the establishment of communal life for the clergy in the cathedral chapter. This effort was modelled on that of Bishop Chrodegang of Metz. By 813, Wulfred was already claiming in a document that he had "revived the holy monastery of the church of Canterbury by renewing, restoring and rebuilding it". Wulfred may have based the rule of the community on Chrodegang's Regula canonicorum, or perhaps on the rule of Benedict. His efforts including requiring the clergy to eat together, to give over their personal property to the chapter, and ensuring that the canonical hours were kept as part of the liturgy. Although it is clear that a communal style of living was practised, whether the cathedral clergy were transformed into canons or if they remained monks is unclear. Later, Wulfred granted land to the chapter, but the gifts would only be valid as long as the chapter kept to the new standards. Wulfred also used his personal wealth to fund the construction of new buildings.

== Disputes with Coenwulf ==
Wulfred came into conflict with King Coenwulf of Mercia over the issue of whether laymen could control religious houses, with the king supporting the rights of laymen to control monasteries. In 808 the papacy informed Charlemagne that Coenwulf had not yet made peace with the archbishop, but by 809 they seem to have been on good terms; the two were involved in a series of land transfers from 809 to 815.

In 814, Wulfred travelled to Rome to visit Pope Leo III. Although the exact nature of his business with the pope is unknown, it was likely connected with the issue that arose between the archbishop and Coenwulf over lay control of monasteries. He was accompanied by the bishop of Sherborne, Wigberht. Laymen controlling monasteries had been customary for centuries, though in the half-century or so before Wulfred became archbishop the church had begun to assert control over monasteries. In England, this attempt to secure control was manifested in decrees made by synods at Clofesho in 803 and more especially the synod of Chelsea in 816. Tensions over the Kentish monastic houses of Reculver and Minster-in-Thanet reached such a point that Wulfred was deprived of authority by the king for a period of some years; six according to the document drawn up in 825 recording the – then victorious – Canterbury view of the debate, though four is perhaps more likely. Wulfred still witnessed documents as archbishop in 817, and by September 822, he was once more officiating as archbishop, when he consecrated King Ceolwulf of Mercia. Wulfred was driven into exile briefly at some point during his suspension from office. However, the dispute was still active in the last years of Coenwulf's reign, as at a council held perhaps in 821, the king threatened the archbishop with exile unless he yielded. Wulfred and the Canterbury community fought Coenwulf vigorously, sending embassies to the pope and concocting forgeries in their favour which purported to have been issued by earlier kings.

Around 820 Coenwulf forced Wulfred into an unfavourable settlement by which Wulfred gained control over the debated monasteries in exchange for a large payment of gold and the loss of a very large estate to the king. Nor did Coenwulf and his followers quickly cede control of Minster and Reculver to the archbishop. In September 822, Wulfred reached a settlement with Coenwulf's successor Ceolwulf, signified by the consecration of Ceolwulf as king, which had been delayed about a year because of the dispute with the archbishop. After Ceolwulf's deposition in 823, Wulfred's situation improved. The new Mercian king, Beornwulf, presided over another council at Clofesho in 825 where the conflict was finally settled in Wulfred's favour and an account of the whole conflict up to that point was written down. Coenwulf's daughter Cwenthryth, abbess of Winchcombe and Minster, paid compensation to Wulfred and lost control over the houses in Kent. Later in 825 (or possibly the following year), however, Kent was lost to Mercia after Egbert of Wessex defeated Beornwulf at Ellendun. Relations between Wulfred and the new West Saxon rulers were cold, and coinage in Wulfred's name appears to have ceased for a time, though it had been restored before Wulfred's death in 832. Final settlement of the debate over lordship of monasteries came in 838 at Kingston, shortly before Egbert's death.

== Death and legacy ==
Wulfred died in 832, probably on 24 March. Most of his wealth was left to a kinsman, Werhard, who was to give the lands to Christ Church after his own death. Werhard, who was a member of the monastery of Christ Church, rose to the position of "priest-abbot" by the middle years of the 830s. This is known from Wulfred's will, which survives in a late copy. This document names Werhard as Wulfred's nephew, and calls him priest.

The Christ Church scriptorium was particularly active under Wulfred. Although the handwriting of the documents produced during Wulfred's archiepiscopate is quite elegant, the actual contents of the charters are marked by bad grammar and other errors. From this, the historian N. P. Brooks has deduced that the clergy of the cathedral were not very literate in Latin, and would have likely been unable to compose new Latin works.

Wulfred was the first archbishop to place his portrait on the pennies struck in his name, which, unlike those of previous archbishops, never made reference to the ruling Mercian king. Wulfred also rebuilt some buildings at Christ Church, Canterbury, although it is not known whether these were support buildings, such as the dormitory and refractory, or if he rebuilt the cathedral itself.

== Citations ==
Christian titles
Preceded by Æthelhard	Archbishop of Canterbury; 805–832	Succeeded by Feologild
