= Jænberht =

Archbishop of Canterbury from 765 to 792, Christian saint

Saint Jænberht
- Archbishop of Canterbury
- Appointed: before February 765
- Term ended: 12 August 792
- Predecessor: Bregowine
- Successor: Æthelhard

Orders
- Consecration: 2 February 765

Personal details
- Died: 12 August 792

Sainthood
- Feast day: 12 August
- Venerated in: Roman Catholic Church; Eastern Orthodox Church
- Canonized: Pre-Congregation

Jænberht (Note: Also Gengbeorht, Iaenbeohrt, Jaenbeorht, Jaenberht, Jaenbert, Jænbert, or Jambert) (died 12 August 792) was a medieval monk, and later the abbot, of St Augustine's Abbey, Canterbury, who was named Archbishop of Canterbury in 765. As archbishop, he had a difficult relationship with King Offa of Mercia, who at one point confiscated lands from the archbishopric. By 787, some of the bishoprics under Canterbury's supervision were transferred to the control of the newly created Archbishopric of Lichfield, although it is not clear if Jænberht ever recognised its legitimacy. Besides the issue with Lichfield, Jænberht also presided over church councils in England. He died in 792 and was considered a saint after his death.

== Early life ==
Jænberht was a monk at St Augustine's Abbey, Canterbury before being selected as abbot of that monastic house. He came from a prominent family in the kingdom of Kent, and a kinsman of his, Eadhun, was the reeve of King Egbert II of Kent. Jænberht himself was on good terms with Egbert.

== Archbishop of Canterbury ==
Jænberht was consecrated Archbishop of Canterbury on 2 February 765, at the court of King Offa of Mercia; this location implies that his election was acceptable to the king. In 766, he received a pallium, the symbol of an archbishop's authority given by the papacy. At this time, Kent had been subjected by Offa; in 776, perhaps at the urging of Jænberht, Kent rebelled and secured its freedom. In 780 and 781, Jænberht attended church councils at Brentford that were led by King Offa. Although initially on good terms with Offa, Jænberht's ties to Egbert were also strong: after the Battle of Otford, Egbert granted a number of estates to Christ Church. When Offa reasserted control over Kent, which occurred by 785 at the latest, he confiscated these lands and regranted them to some of his thegns.

== Elevation of Lichfield ==
During Jænberht's term of office, a dispute arose between the see of Canterbury and Offa which led in 787 to the creation of the rival Archdiocese of Lichfield under Hygberht. Originally, Offa attempted to bring the southern archbishopric of Canterbury to London, but when the papacy refused permission, Offa secured the creation of a third archbishopric in the British Isles. Lichfield was the main Mercian bishopric, and thus the new archbishopric was under Offa's control. There were several reasons for the conflict between Jænberht and Offa. Jænberht opposed Offa's deposition of the Kentish dynasty. They conflicted over land which they both claimed as theirs, and Jænberht refused to crown Offa's son Ecgfrith. Problems were also caused by the archbishop minting his own coins at Canterbury. Matthew Paris, writing in the thirteenth century, stated that Jænberht conspired to admit Charlemagne to Canterbury if he invaded Britain. This story may reflect a genuine tradition recorded at St Albans Abbey, where Paris was based, or it may be a fabrication to fill in details of Jænberht's life where Paris had no other information. A rumour during Jænberht's reign also falsely claimed that Offa was plotting with Charlemagne to depose Pope Hadrian I; at least one modern historian, Simon Keynes, believes it possible Jænberht was behind the rumour. Offa's eventual successor later admitted to the papacy that Offa's actions had been motivated by hatred of Jænberht and the Kentish people.

In 787, Pope Hadrian sent a pallium to Hygberht of Lichfield, elevating Lichfield to an archbishopric, and Ecgfrith was crowned. There is no extant contemporary evidence, however, that Jænberht ever recognised Hygberht as an archbishop. (Note: The archbishopric at Lichfield was abolished after Offa's death, and was no longer an archdiocese by 803.) Canterbury retained as suffragans the bishops of Winchester, Sherborne, Selsey, Rochester, and London. The dioceses of Worcester, Hereford, Leicester, Lindsey, Dommoc and Elmham were transferred to Lichfield.

== Later life ==
Jænberht presided at a council held at London, sometime after the elevation of Lichfield, attended by most of the bishops from southern Britain. He died on 12 August 792, and was buried in the abbey church of St Augustine's Abbey in Canterbury. He has since been revered as a saint, with a feast day of 12 August.

== Citations ==
Christian titles
Preceded by Bregowine	Archbishop of Canterbury; 765–792	Succeeded by Æthelhard
