= Æthelhard =

Archbishop of Canterbury from 792 to 805

Saint Æthelhard
- Archbishop of Canterbury
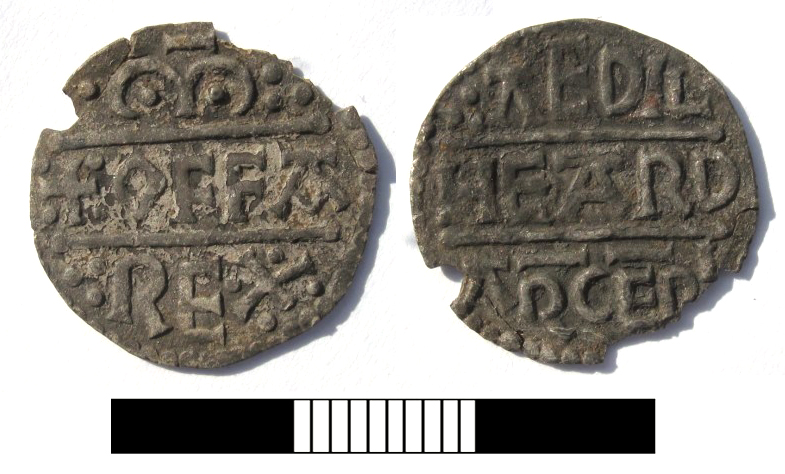
- A silver penny of Æthelhard
- Appointed: 792
- Installed: 21 July 793
- Term ended: 12 May 805
- Predecessor: Jænberht
- Successor: Wulfred

Orders
- Consecration: between 759 and 778

Personal details
- Died: 12 May 805
- Buried: Canterbury

Sainthood
- Feast day: 12 May
- Venerated in: Eastern Orthodox Church; Roman Catholic Church
- Canonized: Pre-Congregation

Æthelhard (Note: Also Ethelhard, Æthilheard, Aethelheard or Ethelheard.) (died 12 May 805) was an Archbishop of Canterbury in medieval England. Appointed by King Offa of Mercia, Æthelhard had difficulties with both the Kentish monarchs and with a rival archiepiscopate in southern England, and was deposed around 796 by King Eadberht III Præn of Kent. By 803, Æthelhard, along with the Mercian King Coenwulf, had secured the demotion of the rival archbishopric, once more making Canterbury the only archbishopric south of the Humber in Britain. Æthelhard died in 805, and was considered a saint until his cult was suppressed after the Norman Conquest in 1066.

== Early life ==
Nothing is known of Æthelhard's family background or early life, however it is assumed that he was a native of Mercia. He first appears in the historical record as abbot of a monastery at Louth, Lincolnshire.

== Canterbury ==
Æthelhard was elevated to the see of Canterbury in 792 and enthroned as archbishop on 21 July 793. Æthelhard owed his appointment to King Offa of Mercia, and the enthronement was presided over by the then-senior bishop of the land: Hygberht, the Archbishop of Lichfield. King Offa consulted Alcuin of York over proper procedure, as the archbishopric of Lichfield was a new creation.

Around 796, Æthelhard was deposed by King Eadberht III Præn of Kent because Æthelhard had been appointed by Offa. Offa had died in 796, and Eadberht seized control of Kent, forcing Æthelhard to flee to the court of Offa's son Ecgfrith of Mercia. Ecgfrith himself died before 796, and a distant relative Coenwulf took the throne. Alcuin encouraged Æthelhard to return to Canterbury, and suggested a compromise over the status of Lichfield, which had been established by Offa in rivalry to Canterbury. Alcuin's plan would have allowed Hygberht to retain archiepiscopal status during his lifetime, but it would be a purely ceremonial rank. In this proposal, Canterbury would regain its status as the only archbishopric south of the Humber and Æthelhard would return to Canterbury. However, Æthelhard was unable to do this while Eadberht was still in power. Alcuin had previously stated that Lichfield had been elevated because of a "lust for power", presumably by Offa, and not through any consideration of the merits of the plan.

Although Alcuin had scorn for Æthelhard for fleeing Canterbury, the papacy saw it differently. Pope Leo III praised Æthelhard for fleeing and refusing to submit to Eadberht, whom Leo compared to the later Roman emperor Julian the Apostate. There are indications, though, that the Kentish community considered electing another archbishop while Æthelhard was in exile.

== Troubles with Lichfield ==
Because Lichfield had been established by the papacy, any change in its status required papal assent. Coenwulf's first embassy to Leo III in 797 about demoting Lichfield did not succeed, mainly because Leo seems to have resented the implied criticism of his predecessor Hadrian I, who had approved the elevation of Lichfield. Coenwulf's embassy bore a letter to the pope that asked for papal advice on how to resolve the problems surrounding Lichfield and Canterbury. The letter reminded the papacy of Pope Gregory the Great's old scheme to have two metropolitans in Britain, one in the north and one in the south, with the southern one being based in London. The letter implied that Coenwulf was asking for Æthelhard's metropolitan see to be moved to London. The same embassy carried a letter from Æthelhard also, which has not survived. The pope, however, did not agree with the embassy. The papal reply to Coenwulf stated that the southern archbishopric must remain at Canterbury, as well as excommunicated Eadberht and authorised his expulsion from Kent if he persisted in keeping Æthelhard from Canterbury.

In 798 Coenwulf invaded Kent and captured Eadberht, whom he blinded and imprisoned. Æthelhard was restored to Canterbury, where he set about restoring the see's possessions. He also managed to secure professions of obedience from a number of southern bishops, including Eadwulf of Lindsey and Tidferth of Dummoc. But, Hygberht was still being called archbishop in 799. Because Pope Leo was involved in disputes in Rome during 799 and 800, and was unable to spare attention for English affairs, no papal decisions could be made on the dispute.

Æthelhard resolved to go to Rome and consult with the pope about the decline in power of the see of Canterbury. The archbishop went to Rome along with Bishop Cyneberht of Winchester, and carried two letters from Coenwulf to the pope. After some discussions, Leo sided with Canterbury and demoted Lichfield back down to a bishopric. Besides these papal actions, there are indications that the cathedral clergy of Canterbury never recognised the elevation of Lichfield.

== Return from exile ==
Æthelhard returned to England in 803, and convened the Council of Clovesho, which decreed that no archiepiscopal see besides Canterbury should ever been established in the southern part of Britain. Hygberht attended the council, but as an abbot, which makes it apparent that he had resigned his see before the council met. At that same council, Æthelhard also presented a papal decision that asserted the freedom of churches from secular authority. While at the council, Æthelhard once more proclaimed that the papacy had been deceived into elevating Lichfield, and that it was a "tyranical power" that had been behind the effort. Æthelhard presided over at least eleven synods, and possibly one more.

Æthelhard died on 12 May 805 and was buried in Canterbury. He was later revered as a saint, with a feast day of 12 May, but his cult was suppressed by the Roman Catholic Archbishop Lanfranc in the late 11th century and never was revived. The Eastern Orthodox Church in England, however, still celebrates his feast and has parishes that have taken Saint Æthelhard as their patron.

== Citations ==
Christian titles
Preceded by Jænberht	Archbishop of Canterbury; 793–805	Succeeded by Wulfred
