= Ceolnoth =

Archbishop of Canterbury from 833 to 870

- Archbishop of Canterbury
- Term ended: 4 February 870
- Predecessor: Feologild
- Successor: Æthelred
- Other post: possibly Dean of Canterbury

Orders
- Consecration: 833, possibly 27 July

Personal details
- Died: 4 February 870

Ceolnoth or Ceolnoþ (pronounced [ˈtʃeːolnoθ]; died 870) was a medieval English Archbishop of Canterbury. Although later chroniclers stated he had previously held ecclesiastical office in Canterbury, there is no contemporary evidence of this, and his first appearance in history is when he became archbishop in 833. Ceolnoth faced two problems as archbishop – raids and invasions by the Vikings and a new political situation resulting from a change in overlordship from one kingdom to another during the early part of his archiepiscopate. Ceolnoth attempted to solve both problems by coming to an agreement with his new overlords for protection in 838. Ceolnoth's later years in office were marked by more Viking raids and a decline in monastic life in his archbishopric.

== Archbishop ==
Gervase of Canterbury wrote at the end of the twelfth century that Ceolnoth was Dean of the see of Canterbury previous to being elected to the archiepiscopal see of Canterbury, but this story has no confirmation in contemporary records. There is no sign of him being associated with either Canterbury or Kent, the region where Canterbury is located, prior to his elevation as archbishop. Given the length of his archiepiscopate, he was probably a young man when he was elected to Canterbury. Ceolnoth was consecrated archbishop on 27 July 833. Upon becoming archbishop, Ceolnoth had to deal with two problems – first the Viking attacks on his archbishopric and the surrounding lands in Kent and second the newly ascendant kings of Wessex who had just gained control of Kent. Previously, the Mercian kings had ruled Kent.

In 836, Ceolnoth presided, with Wiglaf of Mercia, over a council held at Croft attended by the clergy of the southern part of Britain. This was the last time that the archbishop worked in concert with a Mercian king, as, after this, he was an attendee at the Wessex royal court instead of the Mercian. In 838 a council was held at Kingston upon Thames where Ceolnoth allied with the West Saxon kings Egbert and Æthelwulf. This agreement gave control of all of the free minsters under Canterbury's authority to the king in return for protection from Viking raids. Ceolnoth also ceded the right to influence the election of abbots within Kent to the king. In return, Egbert received the support of Ceolnoth for the succession of Egbert's son Æthelwulf as king. When Egbert died shortly after this, Æthelwulf succeeded his father and became the first son to follow his father as king of Wessex in almost two centuries. Ceolnoth also recovered control of some lands that had been lost by Canterbury. The result of this agreement was that the Wessex kings became the secular protectors of the churches and monasteries of the archdiocese of Canterbury.

== Later life and death ==
During Ceolnoth's archbishopric, monastic life declined under the pressure of the Viking attacks, and there was a noticeable decline in the quality of the books and other works produced by the scriptoriums. A number of monasteries died out under the pressure of the raids by the invaders, who wintered over in Kent in 851 and 855. He held councils in 839 and 845, the second at London. During his later years in office, he was assisted by four clerics, who appear to have been or acted as archdeacons, one of the earliest appearances of this office in England. Ceolnoth is also known to have corresponded with Pope Leo IV.

Ceolnoth died on 4 February 870. Although monastic and secular life suffered during the later part of Ceolnoth's archbishopric, his agreement with Egbert set the foundation for the co-operation between the archbishops of Canterbury and the kings of England in the future.

== Citations ==
Christian titles
Preceded by Feologild	Archbishop of Canterbury; 833–870	Succeeded by Æthelred
