= Ralph Neville =

English bishop and statesman (died 1244)

- Bishop of Chichester
- Province: Canterbury
- Elected: before 1 November 1222
- Term ended: 1–4 February 1244
- Predecessor: Ranulf of Wareham
- Successor: Robert Passelewe
- Other posts: Lord Chancellor; Archbishop-elect of Canterbury; Bishop-elect of Winchester

Orders
- Consecration: 21 April 1224

Personal details
- Died: 1–4 February 1244 London, England
- Buried: Chichester Cathedral

Lord Chancellor (Keeper of the Great Seal)
- In office 1226–1238
- Monarch: Henry III
- Preceded by: Richard Marsh
- Succeeded by: Richard le Gras

Lord Chancellor
- In office 1242–1244
- Monarch: Henry III
- Preceded by: Richard le Gras
- Succeeded by: Silvester de Everdon

Ralph Neville (or Ralf Nevill or Ralph de Neville; died 1244) was a medieval clergyman and politician who served as Bishop of Chichester and Lord Chancellor of England. Neville first appears in the historical record in 1207 in the service of King John, and remained in royal service throughout the rest of his life. By 1213, Neville had custody of the Great Seal of England, although he was not named chancellor, the office responsible for the seal, until 1226. He was rewarded with the bishopric of Chichester in 1222. Although he was also briefly Archbishop-elect of Canterbury and Bishop-elect of Winchester, both elections were set aside, or quashed, and he held neither office.

As keeper of the seal and subsequently as chancellor, Neville was noted for his impartiality, and he oversaw a number of changes in the way the chancery operated. Neville was deprived of the Great Seal in 1238 after quarrelling with King Henry III, but continued to hold the title of chancellor until his death. He died in his London palace, built on a street later renamed Chancery Lane owing to his connection with the chancery.

== Early life ==
Neville, who was illegitimate, had at least three brothers: Nicholas de Neville, a canon at Chichester Cathedral; William de Neville, treasurer of the see of Chichester; and Robert de Neville, holder of a prebend at Chichester. The identity of their father is unknown, but another likely sibling was Roger, who held land in Lincolnshire. Robert became Chancellor of the Exchequer, and Nicholas a baron of the Exchequer. Ralph Neville was also related to Hugh de Neville, King John of England's chief forester.

Neville was a royal clerk to King John in the spring of 1207, and in December of that year was at Marlborough Castle on royal business. Earlier references to a Ralph Neville who in 1207 delivered items to Hugh de Neville, or the Ralph Neville who was the same Hugh de Neville's chaplain, may be to the future bishop, but the evidence is inconclusive. Hugh de Neville and Neville subsequently worked together and corresponded on both business and personal affairs. Both men claimed the other as a kinsman.

Neville's activities during the years immediately after 1207 are unknown, owing to the lack of royal records, but in December 1213, he was given custody of the Great Seal of the kingdom. He was Dean of Lichfield by 11 April 1214, at which time he held a prebend in the diocese of London. Neville was appointed to the royal chancery in about 1214, largely through the patronage of Peter des Roches, the Bishop of Winchester and one of the king's favourites. From March to October 1214, Neville was in France with the king. After the king returned to England after 1214, Neville remained in royal service until at least May 1216, although without custody of the Great Seal. His activities during the final period of John's reign prior to the king's sudden death in October 1216 are unknown.

== Royal service and Bishop of Chichester ==
Neville was keeper of the royal seal under the new king, Henry III (r. 1216–1272) (Note: Henry was crowned king on 28 October 1216, at the age of 9.) from about 6 November 1218. He had been at the royal court since May 1218, and was given custody of the seal as soon as it was made up. One of the first documents subsequently sealed was a declaration that no charters or other rights would be granted in perpetuity until Henry attained his majority. Neville was also vice-chancellor of England under the chancellorship of Richard Marsh, who had been elected as Bishop of Durham in 1217 and spent most of his time attending to ecclesiastical affairs in his northern diocese. In fact, if not in name, Neville was responsible for all the duties of the chancellorship, and he exercised most of the power of that office, although Marsh continued to hold the title of chancellor until his death in 1226. When instability threatened the royal government in May and June 1219 Neville was ordered by Pandulf, the papal legate, to remain in London with the Great Seal while a royal council was held at Gloucester. The council resulted in royal government coming under the control of Hubert de Burgh the Justiciar, Pandulf, and Peter des Roches, the Bishop of Winchester.

Neville received a papal dispensation for his illegitimacy on 25 January 1220, (Note: This dispensation allowed Neville to be ordained a priest, as priests were required by canon law to be legitimate.) on the recommendation of the king, Stephen Langton the Archbishop of Canterbury, other bishops, and the papal legate Cardinal Guala Bicchieri, all of whom testified to his good reputation and character. In late October he was named chancellor of the see of Chichester, but was then elected Bishop of Chichester on about 1 November 1222. He was given control of the temporalities of the bishopric on 3 November 1222, and was consecrated on 21 April 1224. In April 1223 Neville was ordered by Pope Honorius III to cease using the Great Seal on the command of the justiciar or other members of the minority council, but instead to do so only at the king's command, essentially ending the royal minority. But it did not finally end until December 1223, and even then, as the king had not yet been officially declared of age, the ban on grants without a fixed time limit remained in force.

== Lord Chancellor ==
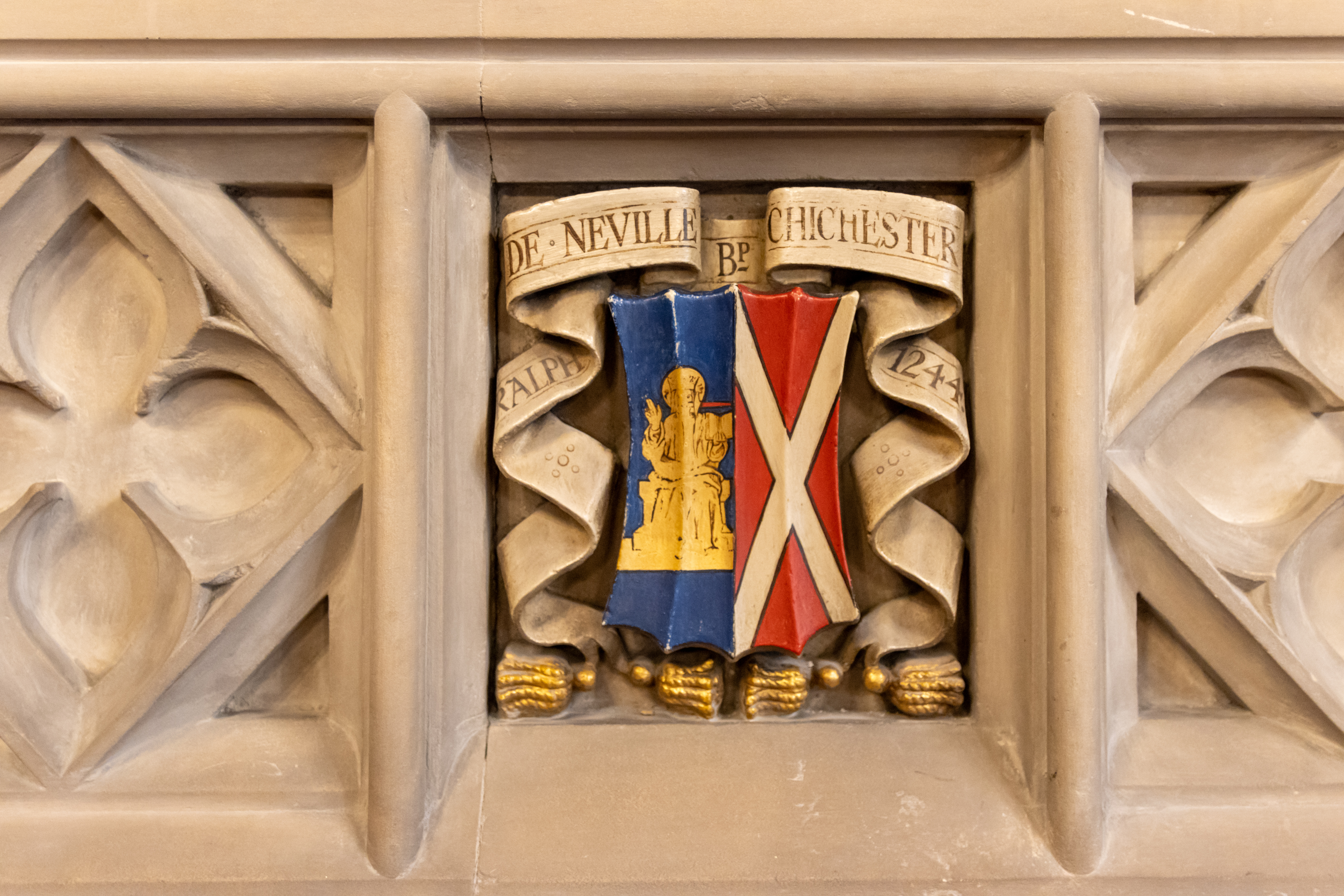
Engraving and coat of arms above a fireplace at Lincoln's Inn, London

Neville was named Lord Chancellor of England on 17 May 1226. The appointment was made by the great council during the minority of King Henry III, and Neville obtained a grant of the office for life. Unlike Hubert de Burgh, who lost his offices when Henry III attained his majority and took control of the government, (Note: Henry III was declared of age for some purposes in 1223, but did not totally assume control of the government until 1227. De Burgh was ousted from power in 1232.) Neville remained chancellor with only slight disagreements until 1238, although a confirmation of the lifetime nature of his tenure was made in 1232. Under Neville, the first signs that the chancery was becoming a department of the government, rather than just a royal department that was part of the royal household, began to emerge. The contemporary writer Matthew Paris praised Neville for his actions as chancellor, claiming that he treated all equally and was transparent in discharging his duties, which was important, as the chancellor's office controlled access to the king. Neville oversaw a number of changes in chancery procedures, splitting off the liberate rolls from the letters close in 1226 and reviving the keeping of the Charter Rolls in 1227. He also issued writs on his own authority, the so-called writs de cursu. Neville received a number of gifts and privileges from the king while chancellor, including the right of exemption from the seizure of his possessions by any royal or other secular official. The king also agreed not to interfere with the execution of Neville's last will and testament.

Surviving letters from the precentor of Chichester Cathedral beg the bishop to come to Chichester over Easter to celebrate the Easter Mass and to deal with pressing issues in the diocese. Neville's duties as chancellor kept him from attending to much of the business of his diocese, but he employed clerics to administer the ecclesiastical offices of his diocese, and in general, his relationship with his cathedral chapter appears to have been good. He employed a teacher of theology for his cathedral, and supported students at schools in Lincoln, Oxford, and Douai. He worked to protect the rights, lands, and privileges of his diocese and cathedral chapter from encroachment by others, both secular and clerical. On one occasion, he threatened to excommunicate the Earl of Arundel or the earl's men for hunting on land the bishop considered to be his own.

Neville was elected Archbishop of Canterbury on about 24 September 1231 by the monks of Canterbury, but his election was quashed in early 1232 by Pope Gregory IX, on the grounds that Neville was an illiteratus or illiterate, even though he had been found to be literatus in 1214 when appointed dean; literatus in this sense meant "learned" rather than "literate". Other concerns were that Simon Langton, the Archdeacon of Canterbury, described Neville as a courtier instead of a true priest, and claimed that Neville's goal was to free England from its feudal ties to the papacy.

As well as his chancery duties, Neville occasionally sat with the barons of the exchequer or with royal justices, and he had a role in the appointment of royal justices. In 1230, he was regent of England while Henry was absent in France, during which time he met with Llywelyn the Great in an unsuccessful attempt to negotiate an agreement that would resolve the disputes between the English and the Welsh. In 1232, during the events surrounding the de Burgh's downfall Neville, along with Ranulf, the Earl of Chester, urged that de Burgh should not be dragged from sanctuary to face the royal accusations against him. Neville's pleas prevailed for a time, but eventually de Burgh was removed from sanctuary.

The king attempted to deprive Neville of the chancellorship in 1236, which the bishop countered by claiming that as he had been appointed during the royal minority with the consent of the great council, only the council could dismiss him. In 1238 the cathedral chapter of the see of Winchester elected as Bishop of Winchester first William de Raley in opposition to the king's choice of William the Bishop of Valence, and when that election was quashed, they elected Neville. His election to Winchester was quashed in 1239, leading to a quarrel with Henry III. Valence was the uncle of Eleanor of Provence, whom Henry had married in 1236. Valence had gained much influence with the king quite quickly and worked to eliminate the older royal officials and institute reforms in the royal administration. This, along with the disputed election to Winchester, was the cause of Neville's fall from favour. Although Henry deprived Neville of the custody of the Great Seal from 1238 until 1242, Neville retained the title of chancellor until his death, thus entitling him to the revenues he would normally have received from the office. The Great Seal itself was held by a number of minor officials, probably to allow Henry greater control over its use by preventing the establishment of another powerful official who might interfere with his plans. But they lacked the power base that Neville had possessed, which enabled him to oppose the king.

In 1239 Neville may have been offered the custody of the Great Seal, which he refused. In May 1242 Neville was once again responsible for the seal while Henry was in France, a responsibility apparently shared with the regent. (Note: The regent during this absence was Walter de Gray, the Archbishop of York.) After the king's return in September 1243 Neville did seal a few documents with the Great Seal until his death a few months later.

== Death and writings ==
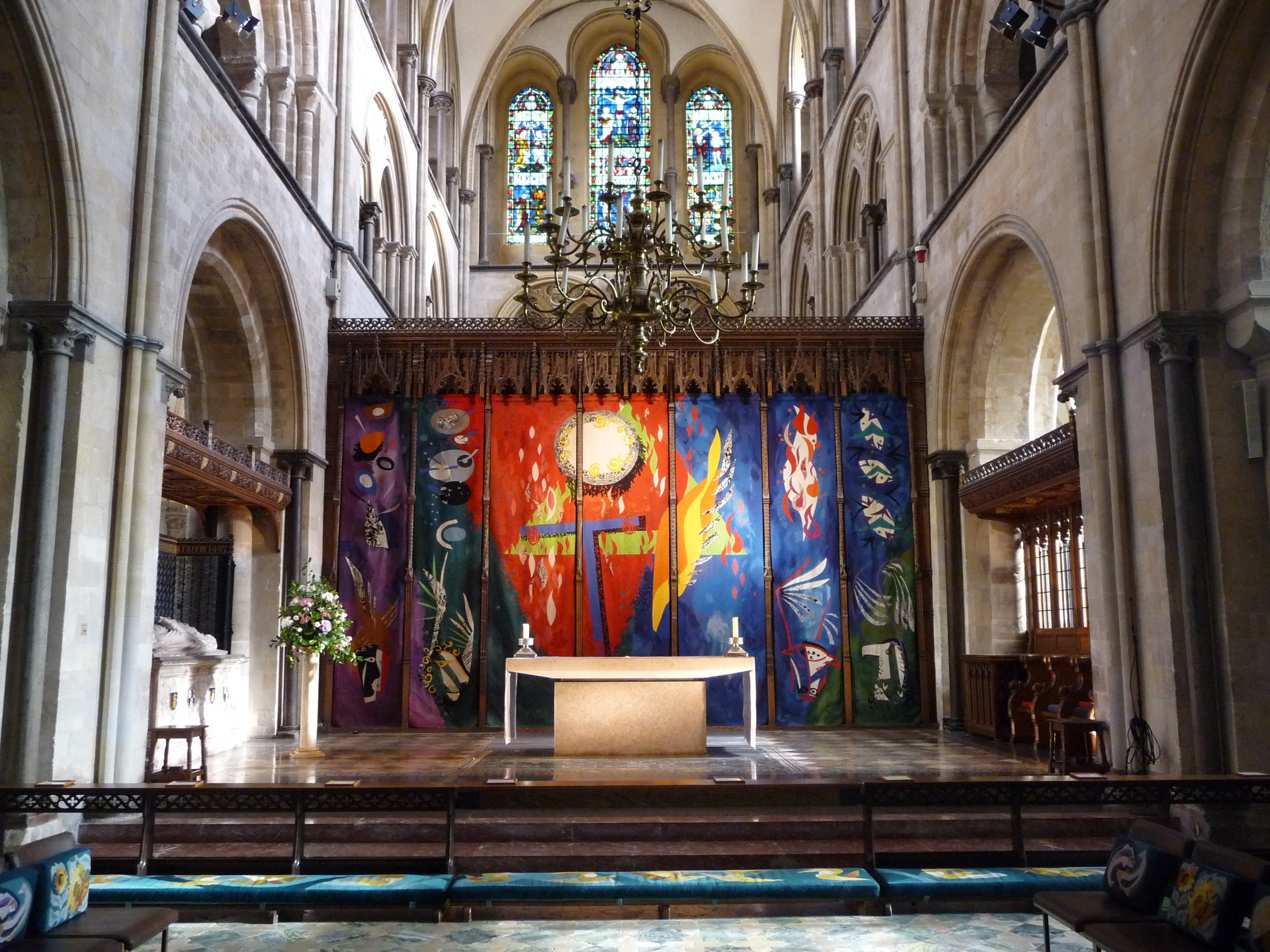
Ralph Neville was buried behind the high altar in Chichester Cathedral

Neville died between 1 and 4 February 1244 at the palace he had built in London in what was then New Street, subsequently renamed Chancery Lane because of his being Lord Chancellor. He was buried in Chichester Cathedral, behind the high altar. After Neville's death Matthew Paris described him as "a man laudable in all things, and a pillar of fidelity in the business of the kingdom and the king". Some of the provisions of his will are known: he left some jewellery and gems to the king, some of his lands were given to his successors as bishop, and other lands and items were bequeathed to his cathedral chapter at Chichester. He also endowed a distribution of bread to the poor residents of Chichester, a gift that continued into the 20th century. Neville also endowed a chapel near Chichester with two clergy to pray for the soul of King John.

Many of Neville's letters survive, as they were collected by him during his lifetime. They are currently in the National Archives of the United Kingdom, having previously formed part of the Public Record Office. The letters were published in Sussex Archaeological Collections volume 3 in 1850 and were edited by William Henry Blaauw. Neville was instrumental in promoting the career of his brother William, but non-relatives also benefited from his patronage: one of Neville's clerks, Silvester de Everdon, was a member of the chancery until 1246, when he was selected as Bishop of Carlisle.

== Citations ==
Political offices
Preceded by Richard Marsh	Lord Chancellor; 1226–1238 (Keeper of the Great Seal)	Succeeded by Richard le Gras
Preceded by Richard le Gras (Keeper of the Great Seal)	Lord Chancellor; 1242–1244	Succeeded by Silvester de Everdon
Catholic Church titles
Preceded by Ranulf of Wareham	Bishop of Chichester; 1224–1244	Succeeded by Robert Passelewe
Preceded by Richard le Grant	Archbishop-elect of Canterbury; 1231–1232	Succeeded by John of Sittingbourne
Preceded by Peter des Roches	Bishop-elect of Winchester; 1238–1239	Succeeded by William de Raley
