= History of Athlone =

Athlone (Irish: Baile Átha Luain, meaning 'town of Luan's ford') is a town on the River Shannon near the southern shore of Lough Ree in Ireland. Located on the border between County Westmeath and County Roscommon, the development of the Athlone owes much to the location of a strategic ford (river crossing point) on the Shannon.

== Borough corporation ==
As was customary in Irish boroughs created before the reforms of the 19th century, Athlone had an oligarchic constitution. The borough existed as a local government unit until it was abolished by the Municipal Corporations (Ireland) Act 1840.

The style of the corporation was "The Sovereign, Bailiffs, Burgesses, and Freemen of the Town of Athlone". The officers were a sovereign, two bailiffs, thirteen burgesses (including the constable of the castle, who in 1837 was Viscount Castlemaine), a recorder, town-clerk, serjeant-at-mace, and billet-master; and there was a select body called the common council. The sovereign was elected by the common council from among the burgesses, annually on 29 June, and had the privilege of appointing a vice-sovereign with the approbation of the bailiffs and a majority of the burgesses. The bailiffs were elected from the freemen by the common council, on the same day as the sovereign, and were ex officio members of the council. The burgesses were elected for life from among the free men, and the freemen also for life, by the common council, of which body, according to the practice of the corporation, twelve had to be present to constitute an election. The common council were unlimited in number, but usually consisted of not more than twenty persons, including the sovereign and vice-sovereign and two bailiffs; they held their office for life, and vacancies were filled up by themselves from among the burgesses and freemen. The borough sent two representatives to the Irish House of Commons prior to the Union, after which it sent one to the Westminster parliament.

== Foundation ==
The ford at this point on the River Shannon has been in use since at least the Bronze Age, and the settlement (including an early Christian site) expanded around this river-crossing. The ford of Athlone was strategically important, as south of Athlone the River Shannon is impassable until Clonmacnoise (where the Esker Riada meets the Shannon), and north is Lough Ree.

== Bridge and defences ==
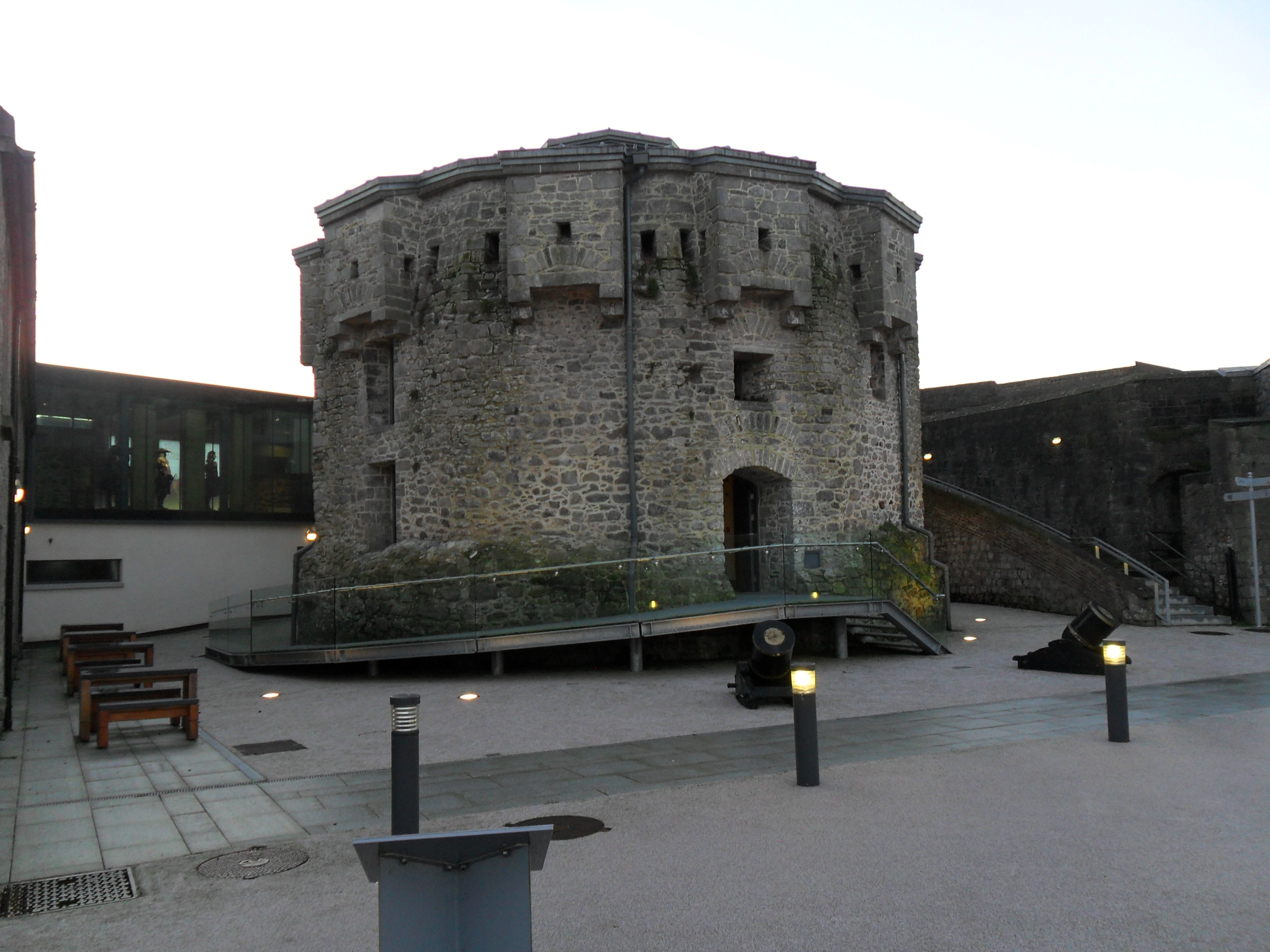
The two mortars in front of the medieval donjon of Athlone Castle are believed to date to the Williamite wars, and were previously located outside the main entrance of Custume Barracks.

By the 11th century, Tairrdelbach Ua Conchobair (King of Connacht) had built a wooden bridge at Athlone, approximately 100 metres south of the current bridge. This was defended by the earliest recorded fort on the site - built on the west bank of the river in 1129.

On a number of occasions both the fort and bridge were subject to attacks, and towards the end of the 12th century the Anglo-Normans constructed a motte-and-bailey fortification here. This was superseded by a stone structure built in 1210 by Justiciar John de Gray. Becoming known as Athlone Castle, this 12-sided donjon dates from the 13th century. Other parts of the castle were largely destroyed during the Siege of Athlone and the external defences were subsequently rebuilt and enlarged.

The currently visible battlements and cannon emplacements were installed to prevent a French fleet from sailing up the River Shannon and establishing a bridgehead in Lough Ree (likewise south of Athlone at Shannonbridge, near Clonmacnoise). The castle was later damaged by a lightning strike on the powder store. The castle was also home to a small garrison, and provided housing for several families until the 1980s. These quarters now house part of the castle museum.

During the wars that took place in Ireland during the seventeenth century, Athlone held a strategic position, holding the main bridge over the Shannon into Connacht. In the Irish Confederate Wars 1641–1653, the town was held by Irish Confederate troops until it was taken late in 1650 by Charles Coote, who attacked the town from the west, having crossed into Connacht at Sligo.

Forty years later, during the Williamite war in Ireland, the town was again of strategic importance, being one of the remaining Jacobite strongholds after they had retreated west following the Battle of the Boyne. At the first battle of Athlone in 1690, the Jacobite forces of Colonel Richard Grace repelled an attack by 10,000 men led by Commander Douglas. The following year the Siege of Athlone saw a further assault in which the troops of King William III eventually prevailed against the outnumbered defenders.

The current bridge was built in the 19th century to replace the old bridge which was becoming dangerous to the increasing volume of traffic. Originally the bridge had a moveable section which was decommissioned in the mid 20th century. Also during the mid-19th century, the Board of Works built a weir wall south of Athlone to improve the navigation of the river.

== Other structures ==
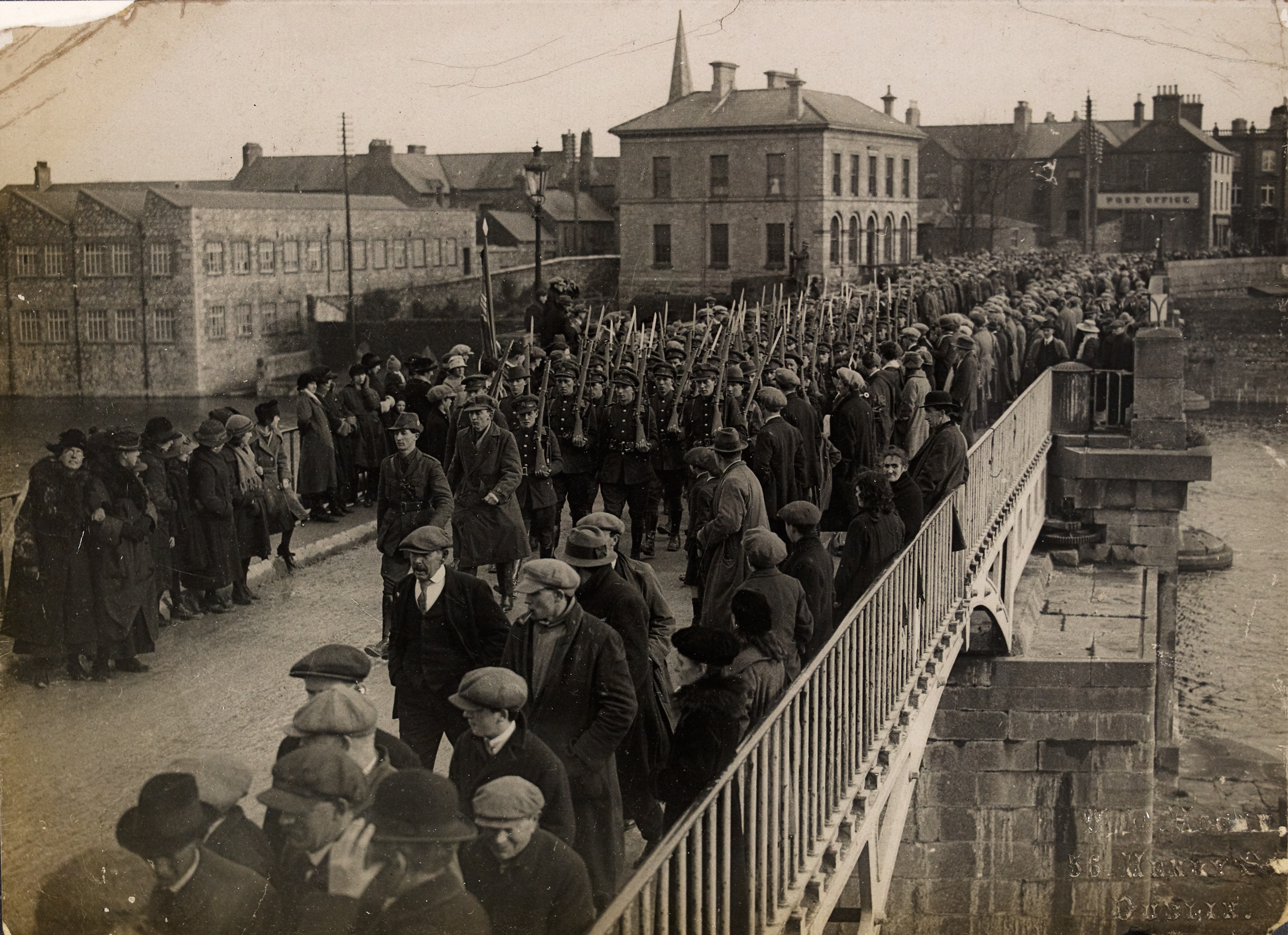
Irish soldiers marching across the bridge in Athlone for the handover of Custume Barracks, 1922.

=== Custume Barracks ===
The town's barracks occupies a large area of the west bank of the River Shannon. Athlone Barracks, named Victoria Barracks in 1837, was re-named Custume Barracks in 1922 by General Sean MacEoin, independence fighter and first GOC Western Command. It is named after a Sergeant Custume who, during the 1691 Siege of Athlone, led a dozen volunteers (of whom 2 survived) out under the Dutch guns to tear down a wooden bridge. The barracks was the headquarters of the Western Command of the Irish Defence Forces until a reorganisation in 2013. It remains the headquarters of several infantry, artillery and engineering regiments of the defence forces. The original entrance to the barracks was where the current Garda station is today.

=== Other fortifications ===
Other fortifications in the area include the ruins of a battery just to the north of Athlone (in an area now a nature reserve) and a large artificial hill called "The Batteries" upon which council housing has been built. The Connaught side was defended by a fosse which no longer exists. The noted tenor John McCormack was born in here in 1884 in an area known as "the Bawn".

=== Oldest pub ===
Sean's Bar is considered by some to be Ireland's oldest pub. It was established on the west bank of the River Shannon on Main Street. In 1970, during renovations, the walls of the bar were found to be made of wattle and wicker. Historical surveys, as recorded in the Record of Monuments and Places and the National Inventory of Architectural Heritage, date the building to the 17th or 18th century, while "possibly containing the fabric of earlier buildings".

=== Workhouse ===
On the east side of town, off North Gate Street, is an intact example of a Famine-era workhouse. The building, renamed St Mary's Hall, now hosts several youth groups and includes a large meeting room. Within sight of the workhouse building is a historic abbey.

== Annalistic references ==
From the Annals of Inisfallen

- AI998.2 Brian, son of Cennétig, [went] to Áth Luain, took the hostages of Connachta in one week, and handed them over to Mael Sechnaill.
- AI1001.5 A great obstruction against the men of Mumu [was placed] on the Sinann at Áth Luain by Mael Sechnaill, and by the king of Connachta and by all Leth Cuinn.
- AI1002.2 A hosting of the men of Mumu into Connachta, and they took the hostages of Connachta at Áth Luain, and the hostages of Mael Sechnaill.
