= Ranulf of Wareham =

13th-century Bishop of Chichester

- Bishop of Chichester
- Appointed: c. 17 December 1217
- Term ended: September 1222
- Predecessor: Richard Poore
- Successor: Ralph Neville
- Other post: Prior of Norwich

Orders
- Consecration: 7 January 1218

Personal details
- Died: September 1222
- Buried: perhaps Chichester Cathedral

Ranulf of Wareham (Note: Or Ranulph de Wareham or Ralph Wareham) (died 1222) was a medieval Bishop of Chichester.

== Life ==
Ranulf was a monk of Norwich Cathedral before becoming prior of that foundation by 1217. Nothing else is known of his ancestry or origins except that he either came from Wareham, Dorset or Warham, Norfolk. He is referred to as magister, showing that he had a university education. He acted as Bishop John de Gray of Norwich's agent during Gray's frequent absences from his see, and after Gray died in 1214, King John of England appointed him the royal custodian of the diocese during the vacancy. With the election of Pandulph to Norwich in 1215, Ranulf was once more left in charge of the diocese while the bishop went to Rome. As the agent for John de Gray, he did most of the administrative work in the diocese.

Ranulf was captured by the baronial forces in May 1216 and was not released until August 1217. He owed his capture to his service to one of the main supporters of King John. However, at some point in 1217, he was elected by the cathedral chapter of Norwich to the office of prior. It is unclear if he was ever formally installed as prior before his election as bishop of Chichester. His elevation to the episcopate was due to the influence of the papal legate Cardinal Guala Bicchieri.

Ranulf was nominated to the see of Chichester about 17 December 1217, and was consecrated on 7 January 1218. His election was a rare example of a monk being chosen as bishop by a non-monastic cathedral chapter. He mainly occupied himself with diocesan affairs, although he did journey to Rome in 1218 to negotiate about the payment of tribute on the king's behalf.

Ranulf died on 14 September or 15 September in 1222, after having been paralyzed for some time. His death was commemorated on 15 September. His bones may have been found in 1829 in Chichester Cathedral.

== Citations ==
Catholic Church titles
Preceded by Richard Poore	Bishop of Chichester; 1217–1222	Succeeded by Ralph Neville
