= Simon of Pattishall =

English judge and civil servant

Chief Justice of the Common Pleas
- In office 1204-1217

High Sheriff of Northamptonshire
- In office 1194-1203

High Sheriff of Essex
- In office 1193-1194

High Sheriff of Hertfordshire
- In office 1193-1194

Personal details
- Died: 1217
- Spouse: Amice
- Children: 2, Walter and Hugh

Simon of Pattishall (or Pateshull) (died 1217) was an English judge and civil servant who is considered the first Chief Justice of the Common Pleas.

== Life ==
The first appearance of Pattishall in the records was in 1190, where he served as the escheator for Northamptonshire and also as a judge, serving in Westminster and as a circuit justice or Eyre. He entered the administration in 1193, most likely thanks to his association with Geoffrey Fitz Peter, and was appointed High Sheriff of Essex and Hertfordshire, a position he held until 1194. In 1194 as part of Richard I's reshuffling of sheriffs following his release from captivity, he was made High Sheriff of Northamptonshire until 1203. During the reigns of Richard I's and John he served as an itinerant justice, and emerged as the senior justice of the Court of Common Pleas around 1190, a role that was only disrupted by the First Barons' War. He served with the court in 1204, and again in 1207 continuously until John's departure to Poitou in 1214.

During the time Pattishall was working in the administration the separation between the judiciary and the exchequer was not yet complete, and he often performed financial tasks. He was Collector of the Carucage in 1198 and again in 1200, and one of the Keepers of the Jews in 1198. In 1213 he was a commissioner assessing damage done to churches in the Diocese of Canterbury following the 1208 Interdict, which was lifted after John submitted to Pope Innocent III. It was during the reign of King John that he emerged as senior judge of the Court of Common Pleas, and he accompanied John on his 1210 trip to Ireland to install English law and custom there. In a core of 15 professional royal justices, he was remembered by Matthew Paris as one "who at one time guided the reins of the justices of the whole kingdom". His special position is also confirmed by the fact that, among the plea rolls produced by the clerks of the various justices, it was those of Pattishall that were considered authoritative, and preserved for future reference. He fell foul of the King in 1207, however, and he and a colleague were fined 100 Marks for allowing a compromise settlement on a criminal case, although they were later pardoned.

In 1215 at the beginning of the First Baron's War Pattishall's lands were confiscated, not because of questions of his loyalty but most likely because they were in a county under rebel control. John was persuaded to relax his restrictions by the abbot of Woburn, and Pattishall recovered his property by the end of 1215, beginning judicial work again in 1216.

Starting with little land, Pattishall increased his holdings throughout his career, and accumulated six Knight's fees and several smaller holdings near Pattishall. He was granted ownership of the Manor of Rothersthorpe by King John, and temporarily held Fotheringhay Castle in 1212. He married Amice, and had two children; Walter of Pattishall and Hugh of Pattishall, both of whom became royal administrators themselves. He also helped found a judicial dynasty; his clerk Martin of Pattishall later followed him as Chief Justice of the Court of Common Pleas, as did his clerk William de Raley.

Legal offices
Preceded by New Position	Chief Justice of the Common Pleas; 1204–1217	Succeeded by Martin of Pattishall
Honorary titles
Preceded by Unknown	High Sheriff of Essex; 1193–1194	Succeeded by Unknown
Preceded by Unknown	High Sheriff of Hertfordshire; 1193–1194	Succeeded by Unknown
Preceded by Unknown	High Sheriff of Northamptonshire; 1194–1203	Succeeded by Unknown
