= Canterbury election of 1205 =

1205 election to the Archbishopric of Canterbury in England

The Canterbury election of 1205 was a contested election to the Archbishopric of Canterbury that led to the long quarrel between King John of England and Pope Innocent III.

== Background ==
King John's attempt to force John de Gray's election as Archbishop of Canterbury in 1205 was the beginning of the king's long quarrel with Pope Innocent III. Traditionally English kings had broad powers over the English Church, and this had survived the Becket controversy during John's father's reign. John, however, reigned concurrently with Innocent III, who was one of the foremost exponents of the concept of papal monarchy.

After Hubert Walter's death in July 1205, the selection of a successor was hindered by doubts about what the proper procedure should be, something that commonly happened with elections to Canterbury. King John postponed a decision while delegations from the bishops of England and the monks of the cathedral chapter went to Rome to seek guidance from the pope. The bishops of the province of Canterbury claimed the right to a say in who was elected, as whoever was chosen would be their superior, but according to canon law the monks of the cathedral chapter had the right to elect the new archbishop. The king also had a say in the election, as the archbishop was a major tenant-in-chief and was traditionally one of the principal royal advisors.

While the delegations from the various parties were in Rome, the monks of Canterbury secretly elected one of their own, Reginald, as archbishop, and subsequently sent him to Rome to join the delegation. When King John discovered that Reginald had been elected without any royal input he forced the monks to elect de Gray as archbishop. Some stories have Reginald's election taking place before the despatch of the first delegation to the papal curia. Another source, Gervase of Canterbury, has the king telling the chapter they could choose their own nominee after six months, while the king secretly sent envoys to Rome to secure de Gray's election. A further story, from Roger of Wendover, states that the monks elected Reginald before Walter was even buried, and that only a few members of the cathedral chapter – the younger ones – participated in the election. Wendover wrote in the 1230s and was not a monk of Canterbury, therefore it is unlikely he has recorded a true account.

De Gray was postulated, or nominated, to Canterbury on 11 December 1205, which presented Innocent with two candidates for the office. In an effort to reach a compromise, the pope quashed both nominations on about 30 March 1206; Innocent's reason for invalidating de Gray's candidacy was that any election was invalid if an earlier one was still under appeal to the papacy. The monks then elected Stephen Langton, with Innocent's approval. John did not accept Langton's candidacy however, and Innocent's consecration of Langton in 1207 led to an eight-year struggle between John and the pope over the rights of the king to secure the election of his choice as archbishop. John refused to allow Langton to enter England and exiled the Canterbury monks. Innocent placed an interdict on England in 1207, which John countered by confiscating the income and estates of any clergy who enforced it. Innocent went on to excommunicate John in 1209, in a dispute that led to the exile of many of the English clergy and John's imposition of heavy financial demands on the church in England; by 1209 de Gray and Peter des Roches, the Bishop of Winchester, were the only English bishops not in exile or dead. But it was not until 1213, when Innocent began to support John's deposition, that the king became concerned and reached a settlement with the papacy.
