= Sean's Bar =

Claimed oldest pub in Ireland

- The façade of Sean's Bar
- Interactive map of Sean's Bar

Restaurant information
- Food type: Irish pub
- Location: 13 Main Street, Athlone, County Westmeath, Ireland
- Coordinates: 53.42267°N 7.94236°W
- Website: seansbar.ie

Sean's Bar is a pub in Athlone, Ireland, notable for its reputed establishment in 900 AD, and claim to being the oldest extant bar in Ireland. However, architectural and archaeological records, including the Record of Monuments and Places and the National Inventory of Architectural Heritage, date the building to the 17th or 18th century.

== Age and history ==
Musicians at Sean's Bar

Archaeological surveys indicate that the oldest parts of the building were constructed in or around the 17th century, with some more ancient materials perhaps having been scavenged and reused from elsewhere. The latter includes research, including by John Bradley on behalf of the Office of Public Works and published in the Record of Monuments and Places and by the National Inventory of Architectural Heritage, which suggests that the building dates to c. 1725, while "possibly containing the fabric of earlier buildings". A 1738 rental survey refers to the building as the "Three Blackamoor Heads".

During renovations in the 1970s, it was discovered that a back wall was partly made of wattle and wicker. A number of tavern tokens, of an unspecified age and now on display in the National Museum of Ireland, were also found.

In 2004, Guinness World Records issued a certificate to Sean's Bar as the "oldest pub in Ireland". The proprietors have claimed to possess a list of "nearly all previous owners" going back centuries, potentially to the time of Luan, after whom Athlone town is named.

In February 2021, the owners of Sean's Bar, in conjunction with other Irish pub owners, won a landmark court case related to insurance pay-outs during the COVID-19 pandemic in Ireland.

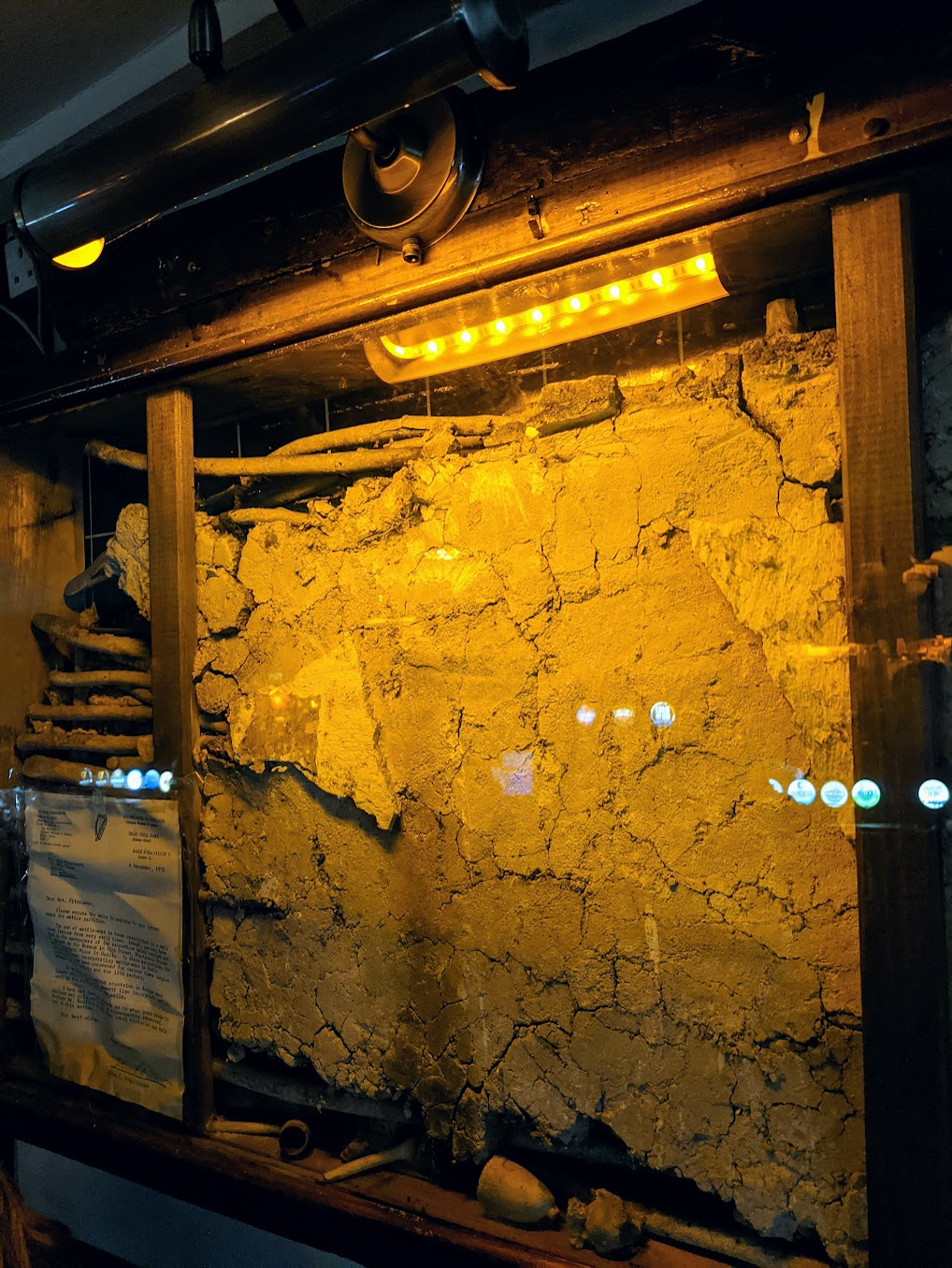
Wattle wall display from previous establishment on the site of Sean's Bar

== See also ==
- History of Athlone
- The Brazen Head
