= Arrentation =

Arrentation (Lat. arrendare), in the forest laws of England, is the licensing an owner of land in a forest, to enclose it with a small ditch and low hedge, in consideration of an annual rent.

By extension it came to mean the conversion of serjeanty tenures into tenures by socage or knight-service, which were easily made to yield a rental income to the Crown. The logic of the extended usage is reinforced by a much stronger personal link, as it was Robert Passelewe, a royal justice of the forest, who was deputed by Henry III to carry out a thorough reform of serjeanties held of the king in 1250. An example noted by Pollock and Maitland is that of Walter Devenish, whose serjeanty demanded that he provide three arrows if the king should decide to hunt on Dartmoor. His new terms required he pay a rent of three shillings, of which one shilling was to come from subtenants. Generally the lever used to transform the tenure was the doctrine of the inalienability and impartibility of serjeanties. Many serjeanties had been wholly or partly subinfeudated without royal approval, allowing the royal agents to threaten complete dispossession if the tenant did not accept the new terms. John had carried out a similar purge of serjeanties in 1205, but this applied only to the honour of Lancaster, which was then in his hands: Henry III's reforms extended his father's changes to the much larger number of serjeanties held of the king. The inquiry of 1250 makes up the greater part of volume 2 of the most recently published volume of the Book of Fees.

== Sources ==
- This article incorporates text from a publication now in the public domain: Chambers, Ephraim, ed. (1728). "Arrentation". Cyclopædia, or an Universal Dictionary of Arts and Sciences (1st ed.). James and John Knapton, et al.
- Pollock, Frederick; Maitland, Frederic William (1895). The History of English Law Before the Time of Edward I. Vol. 1 (1903 ed.). Cambridge: CUP.
