= Alienable =

Alienable may refer to:

- in law, property that can be subject to alienation
- in grammar, a type of possession

== See also ==
- Inalienable (disambiguation)
