= Robert Passelewe =

13th-century Bishop of Chichester-elect

- Bishop of Chichester-elect
- Elected: c. 18 April 1244
- Quashed: 3 June 1244
- Predecessor: Ralph Neville
- Successor: Richard of Chichester
- Other post: Archdeacon of Lewes

Orders
- Ordination: December 1249

Personal details
- Died: 6 June 1252 Waltham
- Denomination: Catholic

Robert Passelewe (or Robert Papelew; died 1252) was a medieval Bishop of Chichester-elect, royal clerk and Archdeacon of Lewes.

== Life ==
Passelewe was a clerk of Fawkes de Breauté, before becoming a clerk in Peter des Roches, bishop of Winchester, household in 1218, and he also served the papal legate Cardinal Guala Bicchieri before that. After the cardinal left England in 1218, Robert often went to Rome to deliver the cardinal's pension payments. On one of these trips, after a request from des Roches, Robert obtained in 1222 a declaration from Pope Honorius III that King Henry III was of legal age. This service for the bishop of Winchester put Passelewe in the opposite party of Hubert de Burgh, who was des Roches's opponent in the minority government of Henry III, and who had not wished the king to be declared of age.

Because of Passelewe's service for des Roches, in 1224 Robert was exiled from England and his property was seized. He managed to regain his property and return to England in 1226, partly through the efforts of the pope, but he remained out of favour at the royal court while Hubert de Burgh remained in power through 1232. By 1233 he was serving as Peter de Rivaux's deputy at the treasury, when he was threatened with excommunication by the bishops of England for his service to des Roches. In 1234, when des Roches fell from power, Robert once more lost most of his property. His offices and lands were confiscated by the Council of Gloucester in May 1234. With the offer of 500 marks, Robert regained the king's favour in 1235, although he did not hold office again until 1242, when the king appointed him Sheriff of Hampshire and put him in charge of the building at Westminster Abbey. He was also instrumental in the forest eyre of 1244 and 1245, which was widely considered to be oppressive.

Passelewe was appointed archdeacon of Lewes in 1244. He was elected to the see of Chichester about 18 April 1244, but was never consecrated as his election was quashed on 3 June 1244. Boniface of Savoy prevented his consecration because Passelewe was ignorant of theology. Another reason was likely that he had served as a royal justice of the forest, which was a post that many bishops, including Robert Grosseteste, bishop of Lincoln, felt to be unsuited for the clergy. Robert himself was more royal servant than clerk, as he was not ordained until December 1249.

Around the year 1250, Passelewe, then deputy treasurer, led a commission to investigate the common but technically illegal practice alienation of estates held by serjeanty: Lands held by serjeantry were held in exchange for some sort of obligation (other than knight-service) to the king. Without the approval of the king, serjeants could not alienate—that is, dispose of or rent—such lands, but this occurred nonetheless. When such alienation was discovered by the commission, the serjeantry could legally be revoked and the lands reclaimed by the king. However, often arrentation would be performed instead: The lands' alienation would be allowed, but in exchange for a "fine" of additional considerations (such as socage or knight-service).

Passelewe left royal service in 1250 after a quarrel over Robert's presentation to a benefice the king had desired to go to Henry's half-brother Aymer de Lusignan. The king forgave Robert, however, by December 1250.

Passelewe died at Waltham on 6 June 1252. He had two brothers, Hamo and Simon, and a sister. Hamo served as sheriff of Norfolk and of Suffolk, and Simon was a royal clerk. Their sister married William of Holwell, who was sheriff of Hertfordshire.

== Citations ==
Catholic Church titles
| Preceded by Ralph Neville | Bishop of Chichester election quashed 1244 | Succeeded by Richard of Chichester |
