= Inalienable =

Inalienable or inalienability may refer to:

- Inalienable right, a type of legal right in jurisprudence
  - Restraint on alienation
- Inalienable possession, a class of nouns in linguistics
- Inalienable possessions, a property category
- InAlienable, a 2008 science fiction film
