= Thomas Blunville =

13th-century Bishop of Norwich

- Bishop of Norwich
- Elected: October 1226
- Term ended: 16 August 1236
- Predecessor: Pandulf Verraccio
- Successor: Simon of Elmham (bishop-elect)
- Other post: royal clerk

Orders
- Ordination: 19 December 1226
- Consecration: 20 December 1226

Personal details
- Died: 16 August 1236
- Denomination: Roman Catholic

Thomas Blunville (or Thomas de Blundeville; died 16 August 1236) was a medieval Bishop of Norwich.

== Life ==
Blunville was a royal clerk and administered the see of Norwich after the death of the previous bishop, Pandulf Verraccio. He was elected in October 1226 with royal assent to his election coming on 5 November 1226. He was ordained a priest on 19 December 1226 and was consecrated on 20 December 1226.

Blunville was a nephew of Geoffrey de Burgh, the Bishop of Ely.

Blunville died on 16 August 1236.

== Citations ==
Church of England titles
Preceded by Pandulf Verraccio	Bishop of Norwich; 1226–1236	Succeeded by Simon of Elmham (bishop-elect)
