= Walter of Pattishall =

13th-century English justice and administrator

High Sheriff of Bedfordshire and Buckinghamshire
- In office 1224–1228

Personal details
- Born: 12th century
- Died: 1231 or 1232
- Spouse: Margery d'Argentan
- Parent: Simon of Pattishall (father)
- Relatives: Hugh of Pattishall (brother)

Walter of Pattishall (died 1231/32) was an English justice and administrator. He was the eldest son of Simon of Pattishall, Chief Justice of the Common Pleas, and elder brother of Hugh of Pattishall, Bishop of Coventry and Lichfield. He inherited lands in Northamptonshire, Buckinghamshire, Lincolnshire, Yorkshire and elsewhere, and as a result of his marriage to Margery, daughter of Richard d'Argentan, he acquired lands in Bedfordshire. He followed his father's footsteps and became a justice, although with less success. His first appointment was as an itinerant justice in the South Midlands between 1218 and 1219, followed by occasional service as a royal justice, sitting for the last time in June 1231.

Although not a successful justice, he was appointed High Sheriff of Buckinghamshire and Bedfordshire on 18 January 1224 to replace Falkes de Breauté, who was becoming increasingly unpopular in the royal court. Following de Breauté's rebellion in 1224, culminating in the successful siege of Bedford Castle, Pattishall, along with Henry of Braybrooke, was ordered in the name of the king to demolish the castle. This caused an issue of loyalties, as both Pattishall and Braybrooke were vassals of William de Beauchamp, who owned the barony of Bedford and held the position of hereditary constable of the castle, but ultimately their loyalty to the king won out and the castle was demolished. Pattishall was replaced as High Sheriff on 5 September 1228, and was certainly dead by August 1232; he may have been dead by August 1231. He was survived by his wife and his son, Sir Simon of Pattishall.

Political offices
Preceded by Falkes de Breauté	High Sheriff of Bedfordshire and Buckinghamshire; 1224–1228	Succeeded by Sir Stephen de Segrave
