= Martin of Pattishall =

English judge

Martin of Pattishall (died 14 November 1229) was an English judge.

He took his name from the village of Pattishall in Northamptonshire and was the clerk of Simon of Pattishall, although they were apparently unrelated. By 1201 he was already respected enough to be collecting the Plea rolls from the clerks of other judges on Eyre. After the end of the First Barons' War Pattishall became the leader of Henry III's professional legal servants, and was instrumental in reestablishing the courts. Between 1217 and 1218 he was a justice on Eyre in Yorkshire and Northumberland, in 1220–1221 in Hertfordshire and at the Tower of London, in March and April 1226 again at the Tower of London; from September 1226 to February 1227 in Lincolnshire, Yorkshire, Lancashire, and Westmorland; and between September 1227 and October 1228 in Kent, Essex, Hertfordshire, Norfolk, and Suffolk. One of his clerks wrote that:

The said M. is energetic, and so conscientious and thorough in his work that he has overwhelmed all his fellows, especially W. of Ralege and myself, with the most exacting labour … Everyday he starts work at sunrise and does not stop till night

In 1217 he was made Chief Justice of the Common Pleas, a position his former master Simon de Pattishall had held and indeed one that his own clerk, William de Raley, later held. Under Pattishall's leadership the Court of Common Pleas began to take shape under the rules of Chapter 17 of Magna Carta; that is that common pleas should be heard in "some fixed place". Previously the Court had been held coram rege, that is, in the presence of the king, meaning that court could not be held while the King was separate from the Chief Justice. Pattishall was rewarded with the Deanery of Wimborne in Dorset, the Archdeaconry of Norfolk and the Deanery of St Paul's. He retired from the bench in 1229 and succumbed to a stroke that year.

Legal offices
Preceded by Simon of Pattishall	Chief Justice of the Common Pleas; 1217–1229	Succeeded by Sir Thomas of Moulton
