= Simon of Elmham =

13th-century Bishop of Norwich-elect

- Bishop-elect of Norwich
- Elected: c. 9 November 1236
- Term ended: 17 January 1239 election quashed
- Predecessor: Thomas Blunville
- Successor: William de Raley
- Other post: Prior of Norwich

Personal details
- Died: 8 June 1257
- Denomination: Roman Catholic

Simon of Elmham (died 8 June 1257) was a medieval Bishop-elect of Norwich.

== Life ==
Simon was Prior of Norwich from 1235. He was elected to the see of Norwich about 9 November 1236 but his election was quashed by Pope Gregory IX on 17 January 1239 after King Henry III appealed to the pope and the case was heard by the papal legate Cardinal Otto of Tonengo.

Simon retained the office of prior and died while still prior on 8 June 1257.

== Citations ==
Catholic Church titles
Preceded by Thomas Blunville	Bishop-elect of Norwich; 1236–1239 election quashed	Succeeded by William de Raley
