= Richard le Gras =

13th-century Bishop of Coventry and Lichfield

- Abbot of Evesham
- Elected: 25 September 1236
- Term ended: 9 December 1242
- Predecessor: Randulf of Evesham
- Successor: Thomas of Gloucester
- Other post: Prior of Hunley Priory

Personal details
- Died: 9 December 1242 Gascony
- Denomination: Catholic

Keeper of the Great Seal
- In office 1240–1242
- Monarch: Henry III of England
- Preceded by: Ralph Neville
- Succeeded by: Ralph Neville

Richard le Gras (Richard the Bold in French; died 9 December 1242) was Lord Keeper of England and Abbot of Evesham in the 13th century.

Richard was prior of Hurley Priory before his election as abbot on 25 September 1236. He was blessed by the Bishop of Coventry on 30 November 1236 and was installed in office on 6 December 1236.

Richard was Lord Keeper from 1240 to 1242.

Richard was elected Bishop of Coventry in 1241, but either did not accept the office or died before the disputed election was resolved. He died in Gascony on 9 December 1242.

== See also ==
- List of lord chancellors and lord keepers

Catholic Church titles
Preceded by Randulf of Evesham	Abbot of Evesham; 1236–1242	Succeeded by Thomas of Gloucester
Preceded by Hugh de Pateshull	Bishop of Coventry and Lichfield; 1241–1242 never consecrated	Succeeded by Robert de Monte Pessulano
Political offices
Preceded by Ralph Neville	Keeper of the Great Seal; 1240–1242	Succeeded by Ralph Neville
