= Richard le Grant =

Archbishop of Canterbury from 1229 to 1231

- Archbishop of Canterbury
- Appointed: 19 January 1229
- Term ended: 3 August 1231
- Predecessor: Walter d'Eynsham
- Successor: Ralph Neville

Orders
- Consecration: 10 June 1229

Personal details
- Died: 3 August 1231
- Buried: San Gemini, Italy

Richard le Grant (Note: Also known as Richard Grant or Richard Wethershed) was Archbishop of Canterbury from 1229 to 1231.

== Biography ==
Grant was a native of Nazeing, Essex and had a brother and sister whom he provided for after he became archbishop. He was chancellor of the see of Lincoln when Henry III nominated him to be Archbishop of Canterbury in opposition to Walter d'Eynsham in 1229. He had been chancellor of Lincoln since at least 16 December 1220, when he first occurs in documents in that office. He was also a distinguished writer. and teacher.

Grant was provided to the see of Canterbury on 19 January 1229 by Pope Gregory IX, and received the temporalities of the see probably on 24 March 1231. He was consecrated on 10 June 1229. He was recommended for the see by Alexander de Stavenby, the Bishop of Coventry, and Henry Sandford, the Bishop of Rochester, who wrote to the pope on Richard's behalf. On 26 January 1231, at a council at Westminster Grant, along with other bishops, objected to Henry III's earlier demand of a second scutage payment. Grant found himself in conflict with Hubert de Burgh, the Justiciar, over the wardship of the de Clare estates at Towbridge, which conflict the archbishop lost after King Henry III of England sided with his justiciar.

Grant then attempted to implement reforms in the clergy over the issue of pluralism and the employment of the clergy in the royal government. In pursuit of this aim, he journeyed to Rome to enlist the papacy's aid, but after a favourable reception at the Curia, he died on his return journey to England on 3 August 1231 in Italy. He was buried in San Gemini in Umbria.

It has been speculated that he is the same as Richard of Wetheringsett, the earliest known chancellor of the University of Cambridge, who served some time between 1215 and 1232, and author of the summa Qui bene presunt.

== Citations ==
Catholic Church titles
Preceded by Walter d'Eynsham	Archbishop of Canterbury; 1229–1231	Succeeded by Ralph Neville
