= The Batteries =

Neighbourhood in Athlone, Ireland

- Neighbourhood
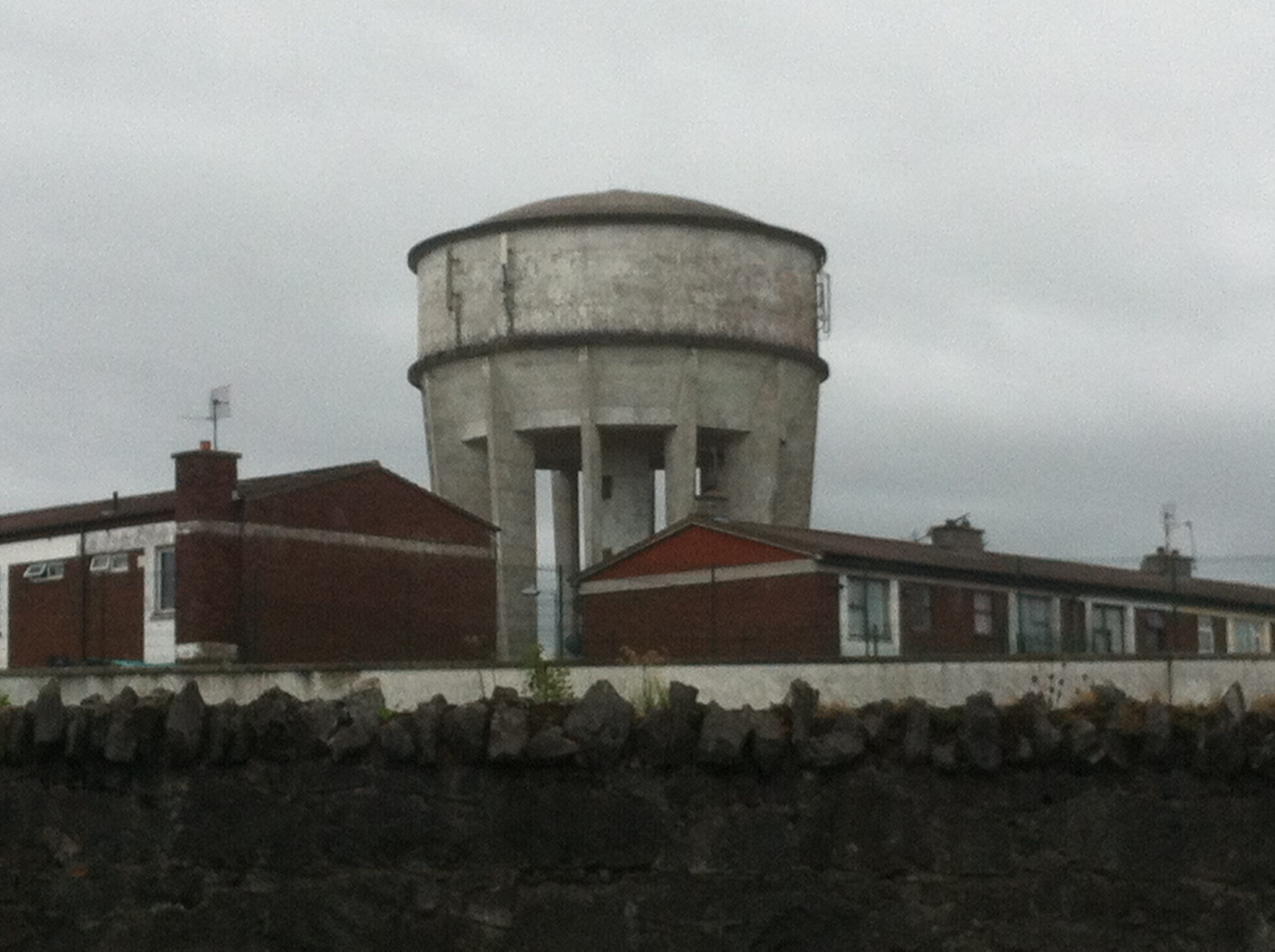
- Water tower and housing at Battery Heights

- Location in Ireland
- Coordinates: 53.4233°N 7.9528°W
- Country: Ireland
- Province: Leinster
- County: County Westmeath
- Town: Athlone
- Eircode: N37

The Batteries is a neighbourhood on the western side of Athlone near the River Shannon. The name derives from a group of Napoleonic-era artillery batteries constructed to defend Athlone and the River Shannon. (Note: Some sources describe the area as being on the "Roscommon side" of Athlone because it lies on the west side of the Shannon."The Batteries". dúchas.ie (Schools' Collection). National Folklore Collection, UCD.)

== History ==
=== Earlier use ===
Before the military works, the area was known locally as "Spa Park", a landscape of raised sandy ground (eskers), low-lying hollows and numerous springs. In the 18th century, writers noted mineral (chalybeate) springs in the wider area, and local tradition associated Spa Park with the consumption of spring water for health purposes.

=== Fortification and battery defences ===
In the early 19th century, additional defences were added to Athlone's western approaches in the form of artillery batteries.

Local accounts identify eight Napoleonic-era gun batteries in the Athlone area, several of which were located on the higher ground later incorporated into the neighbourhood known as The Batteries. The works were connected by routes intended to allow the movement of ammunition and personnel between the river crossing and the gun emplacements.

After the Napoleonic period, the batteries became progressively less relevant as military requirements and technology changed. By the 19th and 20th centuries, many of Athlone's historic defences (including sections of walls, ramparts and later batteries) were gradually removed or levelled as the town expanded.

=== Later development ===
A 9-hole course known as the "Garrison Golf Course" was laid out on the Batteries lands in the late 19th century. The club later developed as Athlone Golf Club and subsequently moved to Garnafailagh and later to Hodson Bay.

A 1930s account in the Irish Schools' Folklore Collection described "The Batteries" as an undulating area of "hills and hollows", around 20 acres in extent.

From the early 20th century onward, the area was increasingly developed for housing, including local authority schemes and later estates. A local history series in the Westmeath Independent summarises a number of developments and date ranges associated with the "Old Batteries" and later projects, including streets and terraces built from the late 1920s through the mid twentieth century, and the later "Battery Heights" development in the 1970s.

=== Surviving remains ===
Only limited physical traces of the Napoleonic batteries are reported to survive above ground. Some local historical accounts identify one battery (sometimes described as "Battery No. 1") as the most recognisable remnant, while noting that much of the wider system was removed during later redevelopment. Some artefacts associated with the batteries were recovered during redevelopment, including an iron gun-fitting which was put on display at Athlone Castle.

== See also ==
- Custume Barracks
- Siege of Athlone
