= John de Baalun =

John de Baalun or Balun (died 1235), was a justice itinerant and baron.

Baalun possessed estates in Gloucestershire, Herefordshire, and Wiltshire. He was descended in the male line from Roger de Breteuil, 2nd Earl of Hereford, but owed his surname and most of his lands to his descent from Hamelin de Baalun (d. 1104), who had been granted holdings in Wales and adjacent English counties by King William II. John's father, Reginald de Balun, had claimed some of these lands as maternal grandson of Hamelin, and in 1207 John de Balun paid a fine for the lands of Hamelin, on behalf of his father, to Geoffrey Fitz-Ace and Agnes, his wife, and 100 marks and a palfrey to the king.

In 12 John (1210–11) Balun accompanied the king to Ireland, but at the end of John's reign lost his lands for taking part in the barons' attack upon the king. On the accession of Henry III he was restored on returning to his allegiance, and in 9 Henry III (1224–5) was appointed a justice itinerant for Gloucestershire along with Matthew de Pateshull, archdeacon of Norfolk, Richard de Veym, and the abbot of Tewkesbury. He died in 1235. His son John paid 100l. for his relief, and did homage for his inheritance, and, dying in 1274, was succeeded by another of John's sons, Walter. John de Baalun was at the battle of Evesham 1265, having married Auda, sister and heir of William Paganell of Bohanton.
