= Peter de Rivaux =

Poitevin courtier at the court of Henry III of England

8th Lord High Treasurer
- In office 14 Jan 1233 – 1234
- Monarch: Henry III
- Preceded by: Walter Mauclerk
- Succeeded by: Hugh de Pateshull, Bishop of Coventry

Personal details
- Died: 1262
- Relations: Peter des Roches

Peter de Rivaux or Peter de Rivallis (died in 1262) was an influential Poitevin courtier at the court of Henry III of England. He was related to Peter des Roches, being a nephew (or possibly a son).

From early in his life he was connected to the church hierarchy. In 1204, when still very young he was presented to a host of churches in the diocese of Lincoln once patronised by Gilbert de Beseby. His application to the bishop (possibly his father) was necessary as he was below canonical age. That did not prevent him from becoming one of the king's chamberlains in 1218 when he was a clerk of the wardrobe. For five years he served the king's inner sanctum, a recipient of the king's extravagant generosity. He held the office of Keeper of the Coast, the precursor to Lord Warden of the Cinque Ports, from the year 1232, and intermittently up until the outbreak of the Second Barons' War. Peter was in effect Henry's chief minister, from 1232 onwards for a short period, holding positions in the king's household and being installed as sheriff (or granted the power to appoint sheriffs in his stead) for some 21 shires. His administration included Stephen Segrave (high sheriff of several counties), Henry of Bath (high sheriff of Gloucestershire), Robert Papelew and Brian de Lisle, and achieved a centralisation under his hand of much royal revenue. He also held the office of Lord High Treasurer from 14 January 1233 to 1234.

He fell dramatically from power in April 1234, consequent on the death of Richard Marshal, 3rd Earl of Pembroke, which was attributed to the machinations of Peter des Roches. The Poitevins had fallen from grace due to unpopularity among the Anglo-Norman nobility. For a time Peter de Rivaux and associates were proclaimed traitors, and Bristol Castle and custody of Eleanor, Fair Maid of Brittany was taken by William de Talbot. Some partial rehabilitation followed. They demanded that Peter take the tonsure, surrender his worldly goods and return to monastic chastity. Sent to the Tower of London, he was expelled from the Court on his release, banished to the sanctuary of Winchester. However, his discomfiture did not last long. He was soon asked back to Westminster to resume duties in the wardrobe. By 1251, his debts were all repaid, for Henry of Winchester had forgiven his old friend. On 16 July 1255, he was elevated to be a Baron of the Exchequer after years of training in the law courts. For a brief time he was raised to become Treasurer of all England, but probably died in 1258, having recovered estates near Winchester.

== Notes ==
Political offices
Preceded by Walter Mauclerk	Lord High Treasurer; 1233–1234	Succeeded by Hugh de Pateshull
Honorary titles
Preceded by Robert de Auberville	Lord Warden of the Cinque Ports; 1232–1234	Succeeded by Walerland Teutonicus
