= Langton by Wragby =

Village in Lincolnshire, England

Coordinates: 53.278°N 0.281°W

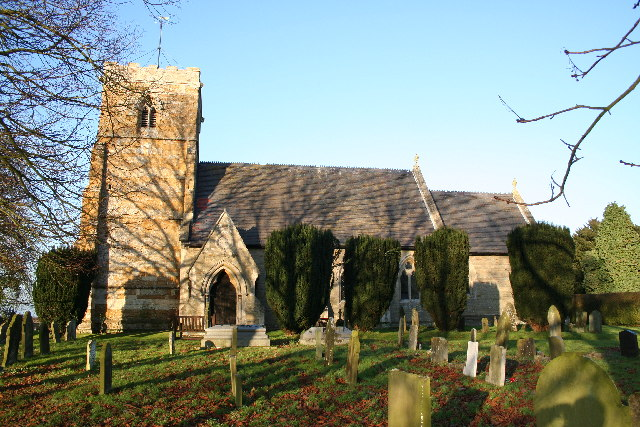
- St Giles' Church, Langton by Wragby

- Location within Lincolnshire
- OS grid reference: TF147770
  - London: 125 mi (201 km) S
- District: East Lindsey
- Shire county: Lincolnshire
- Region: East Midlands
- Country: England
- Sovereign state: United Kingdom
- Post town: Market Rasen
- Postcode district: LN8
- Police: Lincolnshire
- Fire: Lincolnshire
- Ambulance: East Midlands
- UK Parliament: Gainsborough

Langton by Wragby is a small village and civil parish in the East Lindsey district of Lincolnshire, England. It lies approximately 1 mile (1.6 km) south-east from Wragby, on the A158 Horncastle road.

Langton Wood is a small, previously extra-parochial area, now included in the parish.

The church is dedicated to St Giles, and is of 14th-century origin, although it was rebuilt in 1866. It is a Grade II listed building.

Langton Court is the former vicarage, now a house, built in the middle of the 18th century with some 19th-century additions. It is a Grade II listed building.

The early 13th-century Archbishop of Canterbury, Stephen Langton, was the son of Henry Langton of Langton by Wragby, and may have been born in a moated farmhouse west of the church.

The "Stephen Langton Trail" devised to celebrate the 800th anniversary of the sealing of Magna Carta, starts in Langton by Wragby and leads to Lincoln, where there is an original copy of the charter.
