= Walter d'Eynsham =

13th-century Archbishop-elect of Canterbury

Walter d'Eynsham O.S.B.
- Archbishop of Canterbury-elect
- Elected: 3 August 1228
- Quashed: 5 January 1229
- Predecessor: Stephen Langton
- Successor: Richard le Grant

Orders
- Consecration: never consecrated

Walter d'Eynsham, also known as Walter de Hempsham, was a medieval Archbishop of Canterbury-elect.

Walter was a monk of Christ Church Priory in Canterbury, when he was chosen to be the Archbishop of Canterbury on 3 August 1228 by his fellow monks of the cathedral chapter. His appointment was over-ruled by King Henry III of England and Pope Gregory IX on 5 January 1229. He was examined by a group of cardinals on theological matters and declared to have answered badly, thus allowing the pope to declare him ineligible for the office.

== Citations ==
Catholic Church titles
Preceded by Stephen Langton	Archbishop of Canterbury; 1228; Not endorsed.	Succeeded by Richard le Grant
