= Pandulf Verraccio =

13th-century Bishop of Norwich

- Bishop of Norwich
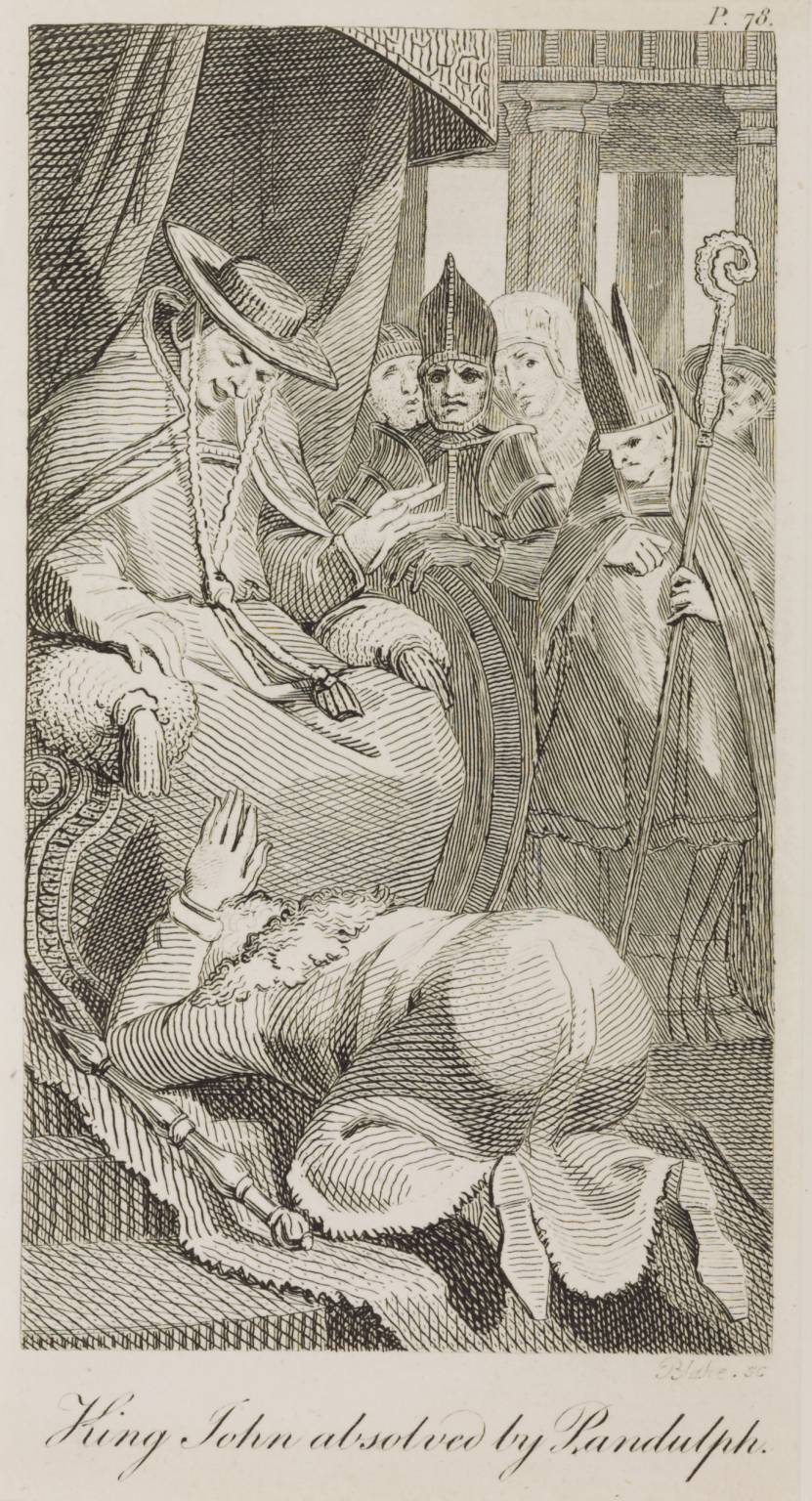
- "King John Absolved by Pandulph" 1797 line engraving by William Blake after Henry Fuseli
- Appointed: 1215
- Term ended: 16 September 1226
- Predecessor: John de Gray
- Successor: Thomas Blunville
- Other post: sometime papal legate

Orders
- Consecration: 29 May 1222

Personal details
- Died: 16 September 1226 Rome, Papal States
- Buried: Norwich, England
- Denomination: Roman Catholic

Pandulf Verraccio (died 16 September 1226), whose first name may also be spelled Pandolph or Pandulph (Pandolfo in Italian), was a Roman ecclesiastical politician, papal legate to England and bishop of Norwich.

== Early life ==
Pandulf came from the area around Monte Cassino. He is often erroneously called Cardinal Pandulph or Pandulph Masca due to being confused with Cardinal Pandolfo da Lucca, who himself was confused with Cardinal Pandulf of Pisa and erroneously given the Pisan family name Masca. His authentic surname may be rendered Verraccio, Verracchio or Verracclo.

== Role in the Investiture Controversy ==
Obtaining no satisfactory concessions in John's efforts to impose Caesaropapism upon the Catholic Church in England, Pandulf is alleged to have produced the papal sentence of excommunication in the very presence of the king. In May 1213, Pandulf again visited England to receive the king's submission. The ceremony took place at the Templar church at Dover, and on the following day John, of his own motion, formally surrendered England to the Holy See and received it back as a papal fief.

== Loyalty to King John ==
Pandulf repaid this act of humility by using every means to avert the threatened French invasion of England. For nearly a year he was superseded by the cardinal-legate Nicholas of Tusculum; but returning in 1215 was present at the conference of Runnymede, when the Magna Carta was sealed. He rendered valuable aid to John who rewarded him with the see of Norwich, England in 1215, however he was not consecrated for a number of years. The arrival of the cardinal-legate Gualo in 1216 relegated Pandulf to a secondary position; but after Gualo's departure in 1218 he came forward once more, after having been appointed papal legate again on 1 September 1218.

== Handling of Brigandage ==
Pandulf is known to have sent a letter to Peter des Roches (who was bishop of Winchester) between 1218 and 1221 urgently requesting action against rampant brigandage on the roads near Winchester (one of the largest cities of England at the time). He wrote:

My lord bishop, the complaints of the poor and of women ought especially to move you, that nobody can travel near Winchester without being held up, robbed, and worst of all—should there not be enough goods on them—people are being killed. Truly, because this sort of thing is a disgrace to the lord king, and to you, and it is going on to the scandal and disorder of the whole kingdom, we ask, advise and firmly instruct your wisdom, as you value the forgiveness of your sins, that you cause this business to be sorted out, so that we hear no further complaints.

== Regency Years 1219-1221 ==
During the years 1219-1221, there are at least 68 letters from or addressed to Pandulf which survive detailing his handling of diplomatic affairs, domestic affairs, national defense, the Exchequer, and his coordination with the Justiciar Hubert de Burgh, the bishop of Winchester (regency member) Peter des Roches, and the vice-chancellor Ralph Neville. In fact, the only two members of Henry III's regency government who have more surviving letters are Ralph Neville and Hubert de Burgh. He sent and received several letters regarding diplomacy, including the reception of a letter from Llywelyn the Great regarding diplomatic affairs with Wales.

== Termination of Legatine and Consecration as Bishop of Norwich ==
As representing the pope, Pandulf claimed a control over Hubert de Burgh and the other ministers of the young Henry III; and his correspondence shows that he interfered in every department of the administration. His arrogance was tolerated while the regency was still in need of papal assistance; but in 1221, Hubert de Burgh and the primate Stephen Langton successfully moved the pope to recall Pandulf and to send no other legate a latere (of the highest rank) in his place. His legatine commission was terminated by the summer of 1221. He was finally consecrated bishop on 29 May 1222.

Pandulf retained the see of Norwich, but from this time drops out of English politics.

He died in Rome on 16 September 1226, but his body was taken to Norwich for burial.

== In popular culture ==
- Pandulf Verraccio is one of the main characters in the stage play The Life and Death of King John by William Shakespeare. Pandulf Verraccio's role centers first upon the Investiture Controversy between King John and Pope Innocent III and Verraccio's subsequent role in blocking the French invasion.

== Citations ==
Catholic Church titles
Preceded by John de Gray	Bishop of Norwich; 1215–1226	Succeeded by Thomas Blunville
