= Hugh de Pateshull =

13th-century Bishop of Coventry and Treasurer of England

Hugh de Pateschull
- Bishop of Coventry and Lichfield
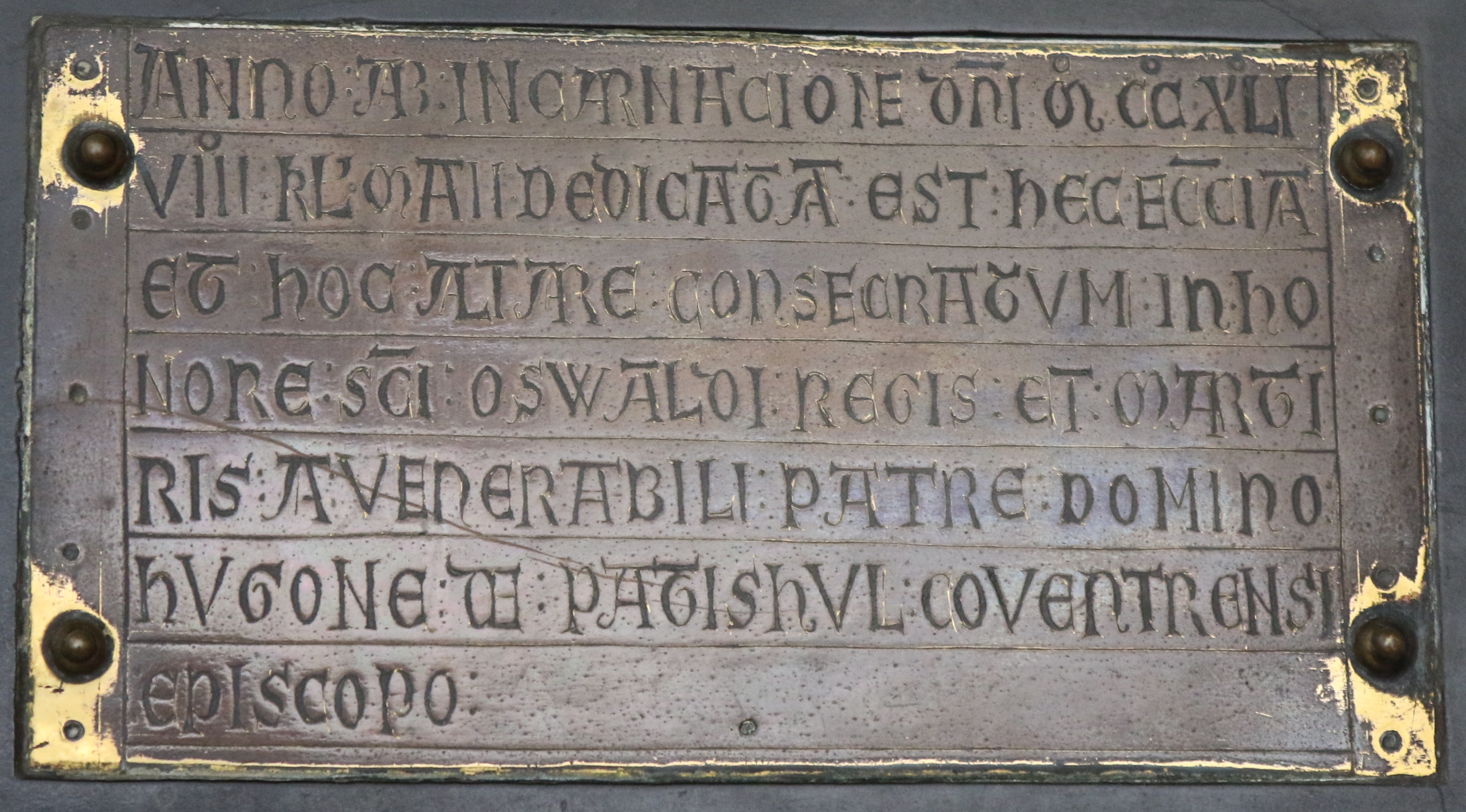
- Hugh de Pateshull's name is recorded on the brass plate commemorating the dedication of St Oswald's Church, Ashbourne on 24 April 1241.
- Elected: 1239
- Term ended: 1241
- Predecessor: William de Manchester
- Successor: Richard le Gras

Orders
- Consecration: 1 July 1240

Personal details
- Died: December 1241 Potterspury
- Buried: Lichfield Cathedral
- Denomination: Catholic

Treasurer
- In office 1234–1240
- Monarch: Henry III of England
- Preceded by: Peter des Rivaux
- Succeeded by: William Haverhill

Hugh de Pateshull (Note: Sometimes Hugh Pattishall or Hugh Pateshull) (died December 1241) was a medieval Bishop of Coventry and Lichfield.

Pateshull was the son of Simon of Pattishall (a royal justice) and Simon's wife Amice. A royal clerk and a clerk of the exchequer, Pateshull had custody of the Exchequer seal—Pateshull's position was a precursor office to the Chancellor of the Exchequer. He was also a canon of St. Paul's when he was selected to be Lord High Treasurer in 1234, holding that office until 1240.

Pateshull was elected bishop in 1239, and consecrated on 1 July 1240. He died on either 7 December or 8 December 1241 at Potterspury and was buried in Lichfield Cathedral.

== Citations ==
Political offices
Preceded by Peter des Rivaux	Lord High Treasurer; 1234–1240	Succeeded by William Haverhill
Catholic Church titles
Preceded by William de Manchester	Bishop of Coventry and Lichfield; 1239–1241	Succeeded by Richard le Gras
