= Reginald (sub-prior) =

13th-century Archbishop of Canterbury-elect

Reginald OSB
- Archbishop of Canterbury-elect
- Elected: before October 1205
- Quashed: before 20 December 1206
- Predecessor: Hubert Walter
- Successor: John de Gray
- Other post: sub-prior of Canterbury Cathedral

Orders
- Consecration: never consecrated

Reginald was a medieval Archbishop of Canterbury-elect.

Reginald was the sub-prior of the cathedral chapter of Canterbury when the monks chose him to succeed Hubert Walter before October 1205. The controversial election was quashed by the pope before 20 December 1206.

== Citations ==
Catholic Church titles
Preceded by Hubert Walter	Archbishop of Canterbury-elect; 1205–1206	Succeeded by John de Gray
