= Eyre (legal term) =

Legal circuit in medieval England

An eyre or iter, sometimes called a general eyre, was the name of a circuit travelled by an itinerant royal justice in medieval England (a justice in eyre), or the circuit court over which they presided, or the right of the monarch (or justices acting in their name) to visit and inspect the holdings of any vassal. The eyre involved visits and inspections at irregular intervals of the houses of vassals in the kingdom. The term is derived from Old French erre, from Latin iter ("journey"), and is cognate with errand and errant. Eyres were also held in those parts of Ireland under secure English rule from about 1220 onwards, but the eyre system seems to have largely gone into abeyance in Ireland at the end of the thirteenth century, and the last Irish eyre was held in 1322.

== Eyre of 1194 ==
The eyre of 1194 was initiated under Hubert Walter's justiciarship to restore royal justice following the anarchy of Prince John's rebellion. Within two months, justices on eyre had visited every shire in England. The Articles of Eyre appointed local knights as coroners to record crown pleas to be presented to the justices. The motivation for this administrative reform was the need to raise money for King Richard I's reconquest of Normandy. The coroners were also required to account for the wealth forfeited by the rebels and list the financial resources of each shire.

== Eyre of 1233 ==
One medieval chronicle asserts that the 1233 Eyre of Cornwall provoked terror in the populace, with men having "fled into the woods" in fear of the judges.

== Itinerant justices ==
- 1170 Gervase de Cornhill; John Cumin
- 1177 Robert Marmion
- 1190 Simon of Pattishall
- 1208 Richard of Staines
- 1209 Gerard de Camville
- 1217 Thomas de Multon
- 1218 Walter of Pattishall
- 1221 Thomas de Heydon
- 1224-5 John de Bayeux
- 1225 John de Baalun
- 1225 Martin of Pattishall
- 1225 Richard de Veym
- 1225 Peter, abbot of Tewkesbury
- 1226 Alambire Lucas
