= William de Raley =

13th-century English judge and bishop

- Bishop of Winchester
- Appointed: 1 September 1242
- Term ended: 1250
- Predecessor: Peter des Roches
- Successor: Aymer de Valence
- Other posts: Bishop-elect of Coventry and Lichfield; Bishop of Norwich

Personal details
- Died: before 1 September 1250
- Buried: 1 September 1250
- Denomination: Roman Catholic

William de Raley (Note: Or William de Ralegh or William Raleigh or William Ralegh or William of Raleigh) (died 1250) was a medieval judge, administrator and bishop.

== Life ==
In 1212 Raley was presented by the King to the church living at Bratton Fleming, in the archdeaconry of Barnstaple, wherein his occupation was described as "clerk", when he studied law. He is known to have served as a clerk of the bench in 1214, and again from 1219 to 1229. From 1225 to 1229 he was the personal clerk of Martin of Pattishall, with whom he travelled the Eyre in Cumberland and Northumberland between 1226 and 1227, where he acted as a commissioner for the assessment of Tallage. He became justice of the bench in 1229 following Pattishall's retirement, with Roger of Thirkleby being appointed as his clerk in 1231.

Raley took part in an Eyre in Middlesex in 1229, and seven more Eyres elsewhere between 1232 and 1233. In 1233 he was made Chief Justice of the Court of Common Pleas, a position he held until 1234 when he was appointed to the more senior position of Chief Justice of the King's Bench, becoming the most senior of the King's judges after the title of Justiciar, which was allowed to lapse.

Raley was a trusted royal councillor as well as a judge, and between 1236 and 1239 was one of the King's chief advisors, being responsible for part of the Statute of Merton in 1236, as well as other legal reforms. In February 1239 he was elected Bishop of Coventry and Bishop of Lichfield, which he declined. He was elected to the see of Norwich on 10 April, which he then accepted; and was consecrated at Norwich Cathedral on 25 September.

Raley was translated to the see of Winchester on 1 September 1242, where he was at first rejected. After three votes at the monks in chapter, they appealed to the Pope for arbitration. But King Henry III of England still objected and appealed to Pope Innocent IV, who rejected the appeal. Finally Raley was enthroned in Winchester Cathedral on 20 November 1244. For the Pope's intercession he paid 6000 Marks, which he struggled to repay for the rest of his life.

Raley retired to Tours, France where he died shortly before 1 September 1250, the date he was buried in the Church of St Martin.

== See also ==
- Henry de Bracton

== Citations ==
Legal offices
Preceded by Thomas of Moulton	Chief Justice of the Common Pleas; 1233–1234	Succeeded by Thomas of Moulton
Preceded by Office established	Chief Justice of the King's Bench; 1234–1239	Succeeded by Sir Stephen de Segrave
Catholic Church titles
Preceded by Alexander de Stavenby	Bishop-elect of Coventry and Lichfield declined 1239	Succeeded by Nicholas Farnham
Preceded by Simon of Elmham	Bishop of Norwich; 1239–1242	Succeeded by Walter Suffield
Preceded by Peter des Roches	Bishop of Winchester; 1242–1250	Succeeded by Aymer de Valence
