= John de Gray =

English royal official and bishop (died 1214)

- Bishop of Norwich
- Appointed: about 7 September 1200
- Term ended: 18 October 1214
- Predecessor: John of Oxford
- Successor: Pandulf Verraccio
- Other posts: Archdeacon of Cleveland; Archdeacon of Gloucester; Archbishop-elect of Canterbury; Bishop-elect of Durham

Orders
- Consecration: 24 September 1200

Personal details
- Died: 18 October 1214 Saint-Jean-d'Angély, Poitou
- Buried: Norwich Cathedral

John de Gray or de Grey (died 18 October 1214) was an English prelate who served as Bishop of Norwich, and was elected but unconfirmed Archbishop of Canterbury. He was employed in the service of Prince John even before John became king, for which he was rewarded with a number of ecclesiastical offices, culminating in his pro forma election to Norwich in 1200. De Gray continued in royal service after his elevation to the episcopate, lending the King money and undertaking diplomatic missions on his behalf. In 1205, King John attempted to further reward de Gray with a translation to the archbishopric of Canterbury, but a disputed election process led to de Gray's selection being quashed by Pope Innocent III in 1206.

Innocent consecrated Stephen Langton as archbishop against John's wishes, triggering a long dispute between the papacy and the King. The pope imposed various sanctions on England and John; at one point, de Gray was one of only two bishops still legitimately holding office in England. In 1209, he became governor of Ireland for John, and spent until 1213 attempting to impose a royal government on the Anglo-Norman barons and the native Irish in that country. Recalled to England to help defend against a threatened invasion by the French, de Gray then travelled to Rome to secure a papal pardon after the final settlement of John and Innocent's dispute over the bishop's abortive elevation to Canterbury. After securing his pardon, de Gray was appointed Bishop of Durham, but he died on his way back to England.

De Gray built a palace in his diocese and several castles in Ireland. Although he was reviled by one contemporary writer as an "evil counsellor" to the King, modern historians have been more forgiving; one praised his intelligence and others stated that de Gray was one of the few men King John trusted throughout his life. De Gray's nephew, Walter de Gray, secured the office of Lord Chancellor with his uncle's help in 1205.

== Early life ==
Some describe de Gray as a native of Norfolk; he was likely descended from the Norman knight Anchetil de Greye. De Gray was the uncle of Walter de Gray, later Archbishop of York. The elder de Gray was instrumental in securing the selection of his nephew as Lord Chancellor, as he was a surety for Walter's payment of a fine of 5000 marks to acquire the position. (Note: A fine is a payment made to a lord or other person, usually either as a regular payment, such as for a lease, or for the ability to take office.)

By 1196, de Gray was in the service of King Richard I's brother John, and was keeper of John's seal by 1198. John ascended the throne of England in 1199, with de Gray becoming Archdeacon of Cleveland in March 1200, and Archdeacon of Gloucester before April that year. He also served as John's secretary, and frequently as a deputy for the Lord Chancellor, Hubert Walter. Shortly after John became king, de Gray began travelling between England and the continent on royal business, and for the first two years of John's reign was active in the royal chancery, sealing royal charters.

De Gray was elected Bishop of Norwich on about 7 September 1200, although the election was purely pro forma, as acknowledged by a contemporary writer Roger of Howden, who stated that the new bishop "succeeded to the bishopric of Norwich by the gift of King John". De Gray was consecrated on 24 September. His consecration took place together with that of the new Bishop of Hereford Giles de Braose at Westminster, at the conclusion of a provincial church council held by Archbishop Walter, which de Gray had been attending. Walter performed the ceremony in a chapel of Westminster Abbey.

== Bishop of Norwich ==
While bishop, de Gray often lent the king money, and on one occasion held the royal regalia as security for the repayment of a loan; he also served as a royal justice. In 1203 de Gray accompanied Archbishop Hubert Walter and several papal legates on an unsuccessful diplomatic mission to King Philip II of France. Philip had demanded that John's niece Eleanor of Brittany or his nephew Arthur of Brittany be surrendered to him together with all of John's lands on the continent, none of which John was prepared to concede. Philip invaded Normandy after the bishops returned to England.

In 1203, some of de Gray's knights were part of the garrison at the castle of Vaudreuil in Normandy, serving under the command of Robert FitzWalter. Although they had provisions and John was moving in support of the troops, in the summer of 1203, the garrison surrendered to Philip, shortly after a siege had begun. When John abandoned Normandy in late 1203, effectively relinquishing control of the duchy to Philip, de Gray was one of his companions on the journey to the port of Barfleur, and went on to England with the king.

== Archbishop-elect ==
John's attempt to impose de Gray's election as Archbishop of Canterbury in 1205 was the beginning of the king's long quarrel with Pope Innocent III. After Hubert Walter's death in July 1205, the selection of a successor was hindered by doubts about what the proper procedure should be, something that commonly happened with elections to Canterbury. John postponed a decision while delegations from the bishops of England and the monks of the cathedral chapter went to Rome to seek guidance from the pope. The bishops of the province of Canterbury claimed the right to a say in who was elected, as whoever was chosen would be their superior, but according to canon law the monks of the cathedral chapter had the right to elect the new archbishop. The king also had a say in the election, as the archbishop was a major tenant-in-chief and was traditionally one of the principal royal advisers.

While the delegations from the various parties were in Rome, the monks of Canterbury secretly elected one of their own, Reginald, as archbishop, and subsequently sent him to Rome to join the delegation. When John discovered that Reginald had been elected without any royal input, he forced the monks to elect de Gray as archbishop. Some stories have Reginald's election taking place before the despatch of the first delegation to the papal curia. Another source, Gervase of Canterbury, has the king telling the chapter they could choose their own nominee after six months, while the king secretly sent envoys to Rome to secure de Gray's election. A further story, from Roger of Wendover, states that the monks elected Reginald before Walter was even buried and that only a few members of the cathedral chapter – the younger ones – participated in the election. Wendover wrote in the 1230s and was not a monk of Canterbury; therefore, it is unlikely he recorded a true account.

De Gray was postulated or nominated to Canterbury on 11 December 1205, which presented Innocent with two candidates for the office. In an effort to reach a compromise, the pope quashed both nominations on about 30 March 1206; Innocent's reason for invalidating de Gray's candidacy was that any election was invalid if an earlier one was still under appeal to the papacy. The monks then elected Stephen Langton, with Innocent's approval. John did not accept Langton's candidacy, however, and Innocent's consecration of Langton in 1207 led to an eight-year struggle between John and the pope over the rights of the king to secure the election of his choice as archbishop. John refused to allow Langton to enter England and exiled the Canterbury monks. Innocent placed an interdict on England in 1208, which John countered by confiscating the income and estates of any clergy who enforced it. Innocent went on to excommunicate John in 1209, in a dispute that led to the exile of many of the English clergy and John's imposition of heavy financial demands on the church in England; by 1209 de Gray and Peter des Roches, the Bishop of Winchester, were the only living English bishops not in exile. But it was not until 1213, when Innocent began to support John's deposition, that the king became concerned and reached a settlement with the papacy.

== In Ireland ==
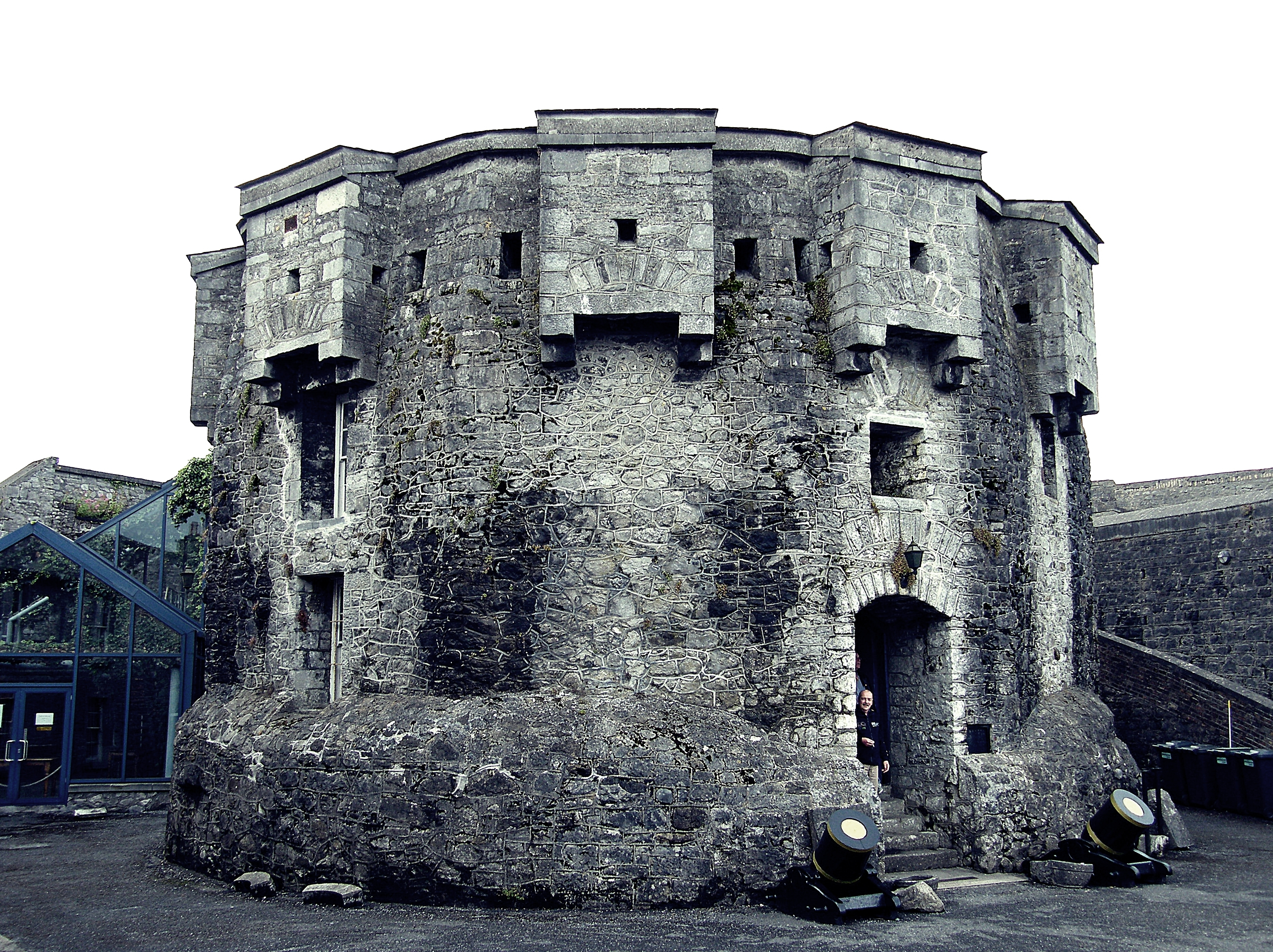
Part of the fortifications at Athlone Castle, built on John de Gray's orders

By 1209, de Gray was in Ireland serving as the king's governor, (Note: It appears that de Gray left England after July 1208, as he was a witness to royal charters constantly from January through July 1208, when he disappears from royal documents.) an office sometimes referred to as justiciar for Ireland. One possible reason for his appointment was to save him from being accused of ignoring the interdict on England. As a bishop, it was de Gray's ecclesiastical duty to enforce the interdict, but by going to Ireland, which was not under interdict, he could continue to serve the king without provoking the papacy. De Gray's chief policy in Ireland was to extend English rule, to which end he was involved in battles on the River Shannon and in Fermanagh. He also replaced the Irish coinage with English, and attempted unsuccessfully to make English laws applicable in Ireland. De Gray's term of office in Ireland coincided with a time of change in Irish governmental practices.

During John's persecution of William de Braose in 1209, William Marshal gave de Braose shelter on his Irish lands. De Gray demanded that Marshal surrender de Braose to him as a traitor, but Marshal refused, claiming that since he held some lands from de Braose, it would be an act of treason to surrender his lord to an outside authority. Marshal's refusal does not seem to have embittered de Gray, however, as three years later the bishop was praising him in a letter to John.

John led an expedition to Ireland in 1210 in an effort to bring the Anglo-Norman barons under control. He opened talks with the native Irish kings, and some accounts state that his negotiations were so successful that the native Irish submitted to him. In contrast, the historian Seán Duffy has argued that the native Irish nobility were just as resistant to John as the Anglo-Norman barons. After John's return to England he ordered de Gray to build three new castles in Connacht, one of them at Athlone. Associated with the castle building were two military invasions of Connacht by the royal government – one from Meath and Leinster and the other from Munster. De Gray left Ireland in 1211 to lead a military campaign against the Welsh, leaving his deputy Richard de Tuit in charge of the country.

De Gray also faced resistance from the northern Irish. In 1212 he led a campaign against Áed Méith, in the promotion of which he constructed castles at Cáel Uisce, Belleek, and Clones, (Note: Besides these castles and the earlier ones, in 1213, five more castles were either refurbished or built on de Gray's orders – at Clonmacnoise, Durrow, Birr, Kinnitty, and Roscrea.) bases for raids against the Ua Néill territory in the north. A naval campaign was also launched, but to no avail. De Gray suffered a defeat at the hands of Cormac O'Melaghlin in 1212 at Fircal, Offaly, and left Ireland the following year. He continued to hold the office of governor for a time, but by July 1213 he had been replaced by Henry de Loundres, the Archbishop of Dublin. One of de Gray's final acts as justiciar was to take a force of Irish knights to England to help repel a threatened invasion by the French king Philip II.

== Episcopal affairs and later career ==
As bishop, de Gray settled a long-running dispute between the monks of his cathedral chapter and his predecessors as bishop. He also allowed the monks of his cathedral chapter the right to appoint and replace the clergy of the dependent churches of the cathedral. De Gray received a 1203 missive from Innocent III decrying the marriages of some secular clergy, in contravention of canon law. In more secular matters, he granted the town of Bishop's Lynn (now King's Lynn) the right to hold a weekly market and two fairs per year. He also built a palace at Gaywood.

De Gray's ability to raise money made him useful to John. In 1213, de Gray mustered 500 knights during a period when Philip II was threatening to invade England, bringing this force over from Ireland along with mounted men-at-arms to support the king in England. In May 1213, John and Innocent finally resolved the dispute over Langton's election to Canterbury, and part of the settlement was that John gave Ireland and England to Innocent and received them back from the pope, making John a papal vassal. The settlement was sealed with a treaty, to which de Gray was one of the witnesses. After John settled with the papacy, de Gray was not included in the general pardon and had to go to Rome to be pardoned. While in that city, the bishop was named as one of the guarantors of a new financial arrangement between the king and the pope dealing with feudal payments from England, which lowered the lump sum that had to be paid before Innocent would lift the interdict. After Innocent pardoned de Gray, the pope recommended his election as Bishop of Durham in 1213; but de Gray died during his journey back to England on 18 October 1214, at Saint-Jean-d'Angély in Poitou. He was buried in Norwich Cathedral, but his tomb has not survived.

As well as encouraging his nephew's career, de Gray took into his household two of Hubert Walter's household clerks: David and Robert of Ruddeby. Another clerk employed by de Gray, Robert de Bingham, was in the bishop's household during the papal interdict on England; he went on to become a tutor in theology at Oxford, and Bishop of Salisbury in 1228.

De Gray remained close to John for most of the bishop's life, and one of the King's chief fundraisers. Sidney Painter, a historian and biographer of John, said of de Gray that he was "probably the only man whom John trusted absolutely and without reservation for the whole period of their association". The medievalist Ralph Turner called de Gray "one of John's greatest favourites", and another of John's biographers, W. L. Warren, described de Gray as "one of the best brains of the royal administration". Matthew Paris, a medieval writer, called him an "evil counsellor", and blamed many of the difficulties of John's later reign on de Gray's failed election to Canterbury.

== Sources ==
- Barlow, Frank (1988). The Feudal Kingdom of England 1042–1216 (Fourth ed.). New York: Longman. ISBN 0-582-49504-0.
- Cheney, C. R. (1956). From Becket to Langton: English Church Government 1170–1213 (Reprint ed.). Manchester, UK: Manchester University Press. OCLC 153989468.
- Cheney, C. R. (1967). Hubert Walter. London: Thomas Nelson and Sons. OCLC 1097086.
- Coredon, Christopher (2007). A Dictionary of Medieval Terms & Phrases (Reprint ed.). Woodbridge, UK: D. S. Brewer. ISBN 978-1-84384-138-8.
- Duffy, Seán (1999). "John and Ireland". In Church, S. D. (ed.). King John: New Interpretations. Woodbridge, UK: Boydell Press. ISBN 978-0-85115-947-8.
- Fryde, E. B.; Greenway, D. E.; Porter, S.; Roy, I. (1996). Handbook of British Chronology (Third revised ed.). Cambridge, UK: Cambridge University Press. ISBN 0-521-56350-X.
- Gillingham, John (2001). The Angevin Empire (Second ed.). London: Hodder Arnold. ISBN 978-0-340-74115-3.
- Greenway, Diana G. (1971). Fasti Ecclesiae Anglicanae 1066-1300: Volume 2: Monastic Cathedrals (Northern and Southern Provinces): Durham: Bishops. Institute of Historical Research. Archived from the original on 19 July 2011.
- Greenway, Diana G. (1971). Fasti Ecclesiae Anglicanae 1066–1300: Volume 2: Monastic Cathedrals (Northern and Southern Provinces): Worcester: Archdeacons of Gloucester. Institute of Historical Research. Archived from the original on 7 June 2007.
- Greenway, Diana G. (1999). Fasti Ecclesiae Anglicanae 1066–1300: Volume 6: York: Archdeacons of Cleveland. Institute of Historical Research. Archived from the original on 7 June 2007.
- Haines, Roy Martin (2004). "Gray, John de (d. 1214)". Oxford Dictionary of National Biography. Oxford University Press. doi:10.1093/ref:odnb/11541. (subscription, Wikipedia Library access or UK public library membership required)
- Harding, Alan (1993). England in the Thirteenth Century. Cambridge, UK: Cambridge University Press. ISBN 0-521-31612-X.
- Harper-Bill, Christopher (1999). "John and the Church of Rome". In Church, S. D. (ed.). King John: New Interpretations. Woodbridge, UK: Boydell Press. ISBN 978-0-85115-947-8.
- Huscroft, Richard (2005). Ruling England 1042–1217. London: Pearson/Longman. ISBN 0-582-84882-2.
- Jones, J. A. P. (1971). King John and Magna Carta. London: Longman. ISBN 0-582-31463-1.
- Knowles, M. D. (April 1938). "The Canterbury Election of 1205–6". English Historical Review. 53 (210): 211–220. doi:10.1093/ehr/LIII.CCX.211. JSTOR 554203.
- Lyon, Bryce Dale (1980). A Constitutional and Legal History of Medieval England (Second ed.). New York: Norton. ISBN 0-393-95132-4.
- Orpen, Goddard H. (1907). "Athlone Castle: Its Early History, with Notes on some Neighboring Castles". Journal of the Royal Society of Antiquaries of Ireland. Fifth series. 37 (3): 257–276. JSTOR 25507617.
- Otway-Ruthven, A. J. (1993). History of Medieval Ireland. New York: Barnes & Noble. ISBN 1-56619-216-1.
- Powell, J. Enoch; Wallis, Keith (1968). The House of Lords in the Middle Ages: A History of the English House of Lords to 1540. London: Weidenfeld and Nicolson. ISBN 9780297761051. OCLC 463626.
- Powicke, Maurice (1999) [1960]. The Loss of Normandy 1189–1204: Studies in the History of the Angevin Kingdom (Second ed.). Manchester, UK: Manchester University Press. ISBN 0-7190-5740-X.
- Richardson, H. G. (September 1942). "Norman Ireland in 1212". Irish Historical Studies. 3 (10): 144–158. doi:10.1017/S0021121400034799. JSTOR 30006629. S2CID 163374678.
- Turner, Ralph V. (2005). King John: England's Evil King?. Stroud, UK: Tempus. ISBN 0-7524-3385-7.
- Vincent, Nicholas (2002). Peter des Roches: An Alien in English Politics 1205–1238 (Reprint ed.). Cambridge, UK: Cambridge University Press. ISBN 0-521-52215-3.
- Warren, W. L. (1978). King John. Berkeley, CA: University of California Press. ISBN 0-520-03643-3.
- Wood, Herbert (1921–1924). "The Office of Chief Governor of Ireland, 1172–1509". Proceedings of the Royal Irish Academy, Section C. 36: 206–238. JSTOR 25504230.
- Young, Charles R. (1968). Hubert Walter: Lord of Canterbury and Lord of England. Durham, NC: Duke University Press. OCLC 443445.

Catholic Church titles
Preceded by John of Oxford	Bishop of Norwich; 1200–1214	Vacant Title next held by Pandulf Verraccio
Preceded by Hubert Walter	Archbishop-elect of Canterbury; 1205–1206 set aside by Pope Innocent III	Succeeded by Stephen Langton
Preceded by Richard Poore	Bishop-elect of Durham; 1214; Died before enthronement	Succeeded by Morgan
Political offices
Preceded by Meiler Fitzhenry	Justiciar of Ireland; 1208–1213	Succeeded by Henry de Loundres
