= Athlone Castle =

12th century castle in Westmeath, Ireland

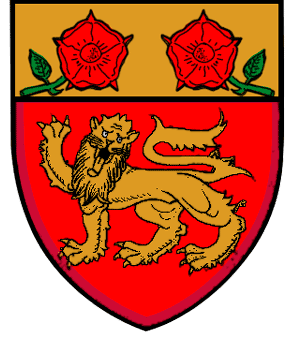
Athlone Castle
- Part of the Town of Athlone
- Athlone, Westmeath in Ireland

Site information
- Type: Castle
- Owner: City of Athlone, Ireland
- Operator: Athlone Arts and Tourism
- Open to the public: Yes
- Condition: Restored
- Website: athlonecastle.ie

Location
- Location in Ireland
- Coordinates: 53°25′24″N 7°56′33″W

Site history
- Built: 1129 (Wooden fort), 1210 (Motte-and-Bailey)
- Built by: Bishop John de Gray of Norwich
- In use: 1129-1969
- Battles/wars: Siege of Athlone

National monument of Ireland
- Official name: Athlone Castle
- Reference no.: 520

Athlone Castle, sometimes known as Adamson Castle, is a castle located in Athlone, County Westmeath, Ireland, dating from the 12th century.

== History ==
The earliest recorded "castle" of Athlone was a wooden structure built in 1129, by King Tairrdelbach Ua Conchobair of Connacht, possibly on the site of the present castle. The stone castle which survives today dates from 1210 and was built for King John by his Irish Justiciar, Bishop John de Gray of Norwich. It was built to defend the crossing point of the river at Athlone and to provide a bridgehead to facilitate the Norman advance into Connaught.

The castle of 1210 was a free-standing polygonal tower built on a newly built (or existing) ‘motte’ or man-made hill. This tower, though greatly altered, can still be seen as the central keep or ‘donjon’ of the castle today. At the time the castle was built on the Shannon, as it passed through Athlone, was very different from today. It is likely that in the early days of its existence the castle enjoyed the protection of a fosse or moat.

The castle was greatly fortified in the late 13th century (c1276) when the original ‘motte’ was surrounded by a curtain wall with three-quarter round towers (or drum towers) at the corner. These features, again greatly rebuilt, still survive today. The castle was reconstructed by Sir William Brabazon in 1547. The external walls and towers came under heavy fire during the Sieges of Athlone in 1690-91 and were later destroyed when lightning struck the castle in 1697. The castle as we view it today shows signs of extensive remodelling during the Napoleonic era when it was modernised and adapted for artillery. Today the squat drum towers are somewhat reminiscent of the Martello towers (again of the Napoleonic era) which are found along the east coast, near Cork and to a lesser degree, on the west coast of Ireland.

The large scale Ordnance Survey map of 1874 names some of the features which were then extant on the castle. These include: Officers’ quarters & soldiers’ quarters; master gunners’ quarters; guardhouse; ablutions room; cookhouse; kitchen; guardhouse and draw bridge. The officers’ quarters and soldiers’ quarters were located in the five-bay, two-storey barrack building which overlooks Main Street. This late Georgian building dates to c1810.

A careful examination of the Castle still reveals many interesting features including the shape of the ‘sally gate’ in the wall of the castle overlooking the Shannon; a bow loop recalling the era when the castle was protected by archers, in the wall facing into Castle Street as well as gun-embrasures and pistol loops on the walls protecting the entrance ramp. One important feature which disappeared in the 20th century was the drawbridge which survived until the 1940s.

The Keep of the Castle is a National Monument. The castle which had been part of the defences of Athlone for 750 years became the home of a museum run by the Old Athlone Society in 1967 and of a modern visitor centre developed by Athlone Urban District Council in 1991. Since 2012 it is managed by Athlone Arts and Tourism. Athlone Castle is pivotal to the understanding of the development of the town of Athlone, linking the modern Athlone with its Norman founders.

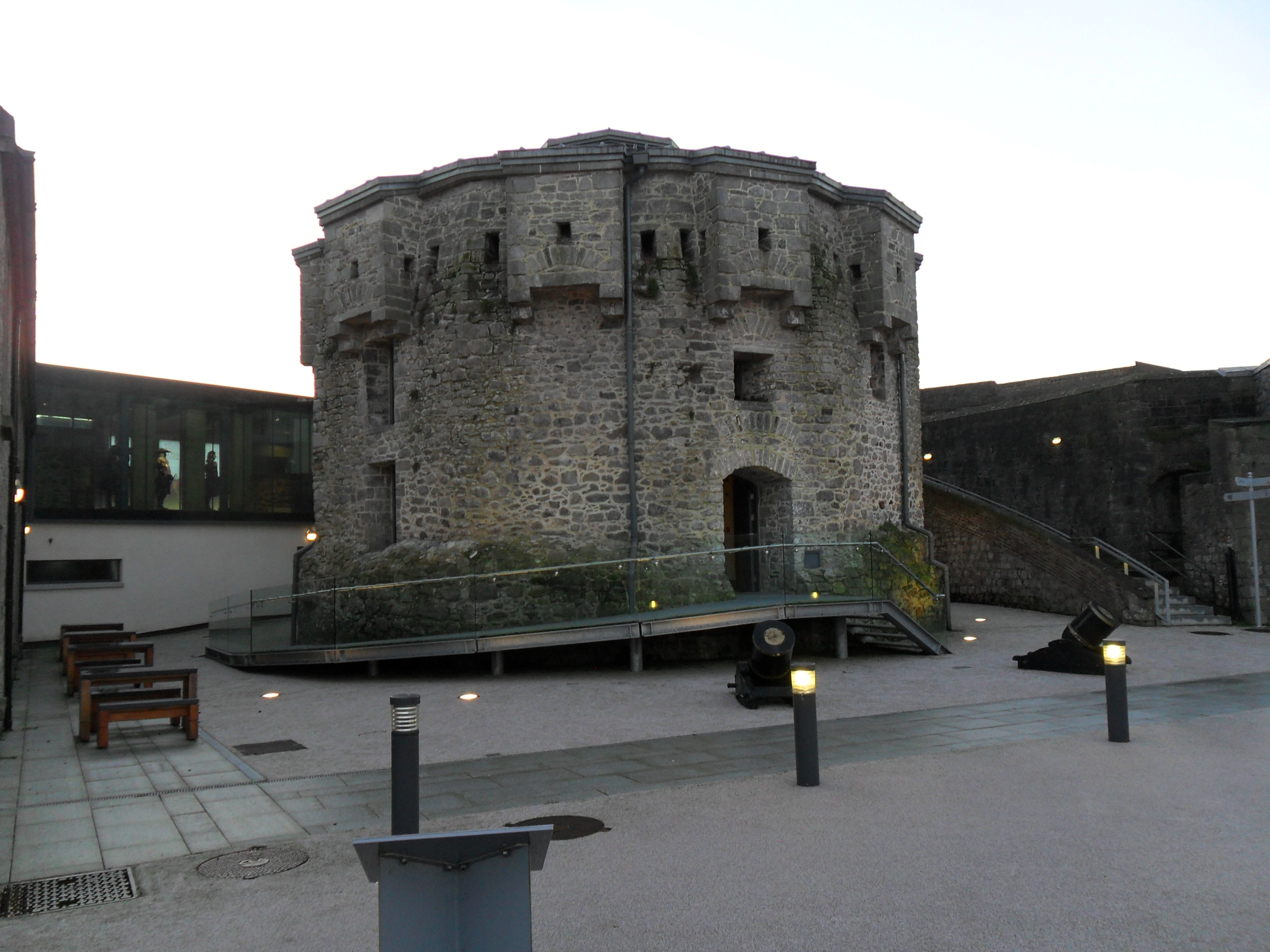
View within the Castle fortification in Athlone after the restoration works

== Refurbishments ==
Athlone Castle was closed between November 2011 and November 2012 while it underwent a multimillion-euro renovation. The project added more exhibition spaces to the castle and introduced new interpretation and included illustrations by Victor Ambrus.
