= Stephen Langton =

Archbishop of Canterbury from 1207 to 1228

- Cardinal; Archbishop of Canterbury
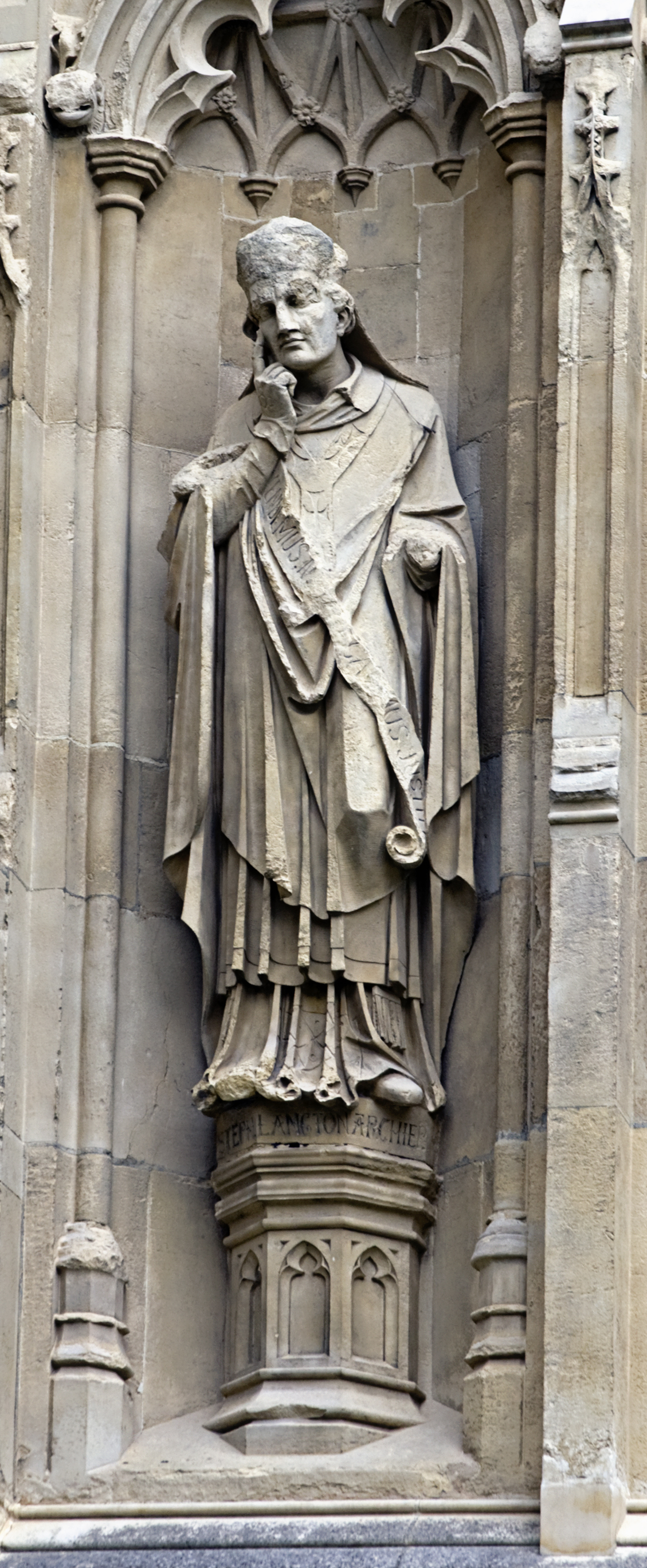
- Statue of Langton from the exterior of Canterbury Cathedral
- Appointed: c. 1207
- Term ended: 9 July 1228
- Predecessor: John de Gray
- Successor: Walter d'Eynsham

Orders
- Consecration: 17 June 1207 by Innocent III
- Created cardinal: 1206 by Pope Innocent III
- Rank: Cardinal priest of San Crisogono

Personal details
- Born: c. 1150
- Died: 9 July 1228 Slindon, Sussex
- Buried: Canterbury Cathedral
- Denomination: Catholic Church
- Parents: Henry Langton

Stephen Langton (c. 1150 – 9 July 1228) was an English cardinal of the Catholic Church and Archbishop of Canterbury from 1207 until his death in 1228. The dispute between King John of England and Pope Innocent III over his election was a major factor in the crisis which produced Magna Carta in 1215. Langton is also credited with having divided the Bible into the standard modern arrangement of chapters used today.

== Early life and career ==
His father was Henry Langton, a landowner in Langton by Wragby, Lincolnshire. Stephen Langton may have been born in a moated farmhouse in the village, and was probably educated in his local cathedral school. He could also have been born at Friday Street, Surrey, according to local legend.

Stephen studied at the University of Paris and lectured there on theology until 1206, when Pope Innocent III, with whom he had formed a friendship in Paris, called him to Rome and made him cardinal-priest of San Crisogono, Rome. His piety and learning had already won him prebends in Paris and York and he was recognised as the foremost English churchman.

His brother Simon Langton was elected Archbishop of York in 1215, but that election was quashed by Pope Innocent III. Simon served his brother Stephen as Archdeacon of Canterbury in 1227. Simon and Stephen had another brother named Walter, a knight who died childless.

== Archbishop ==
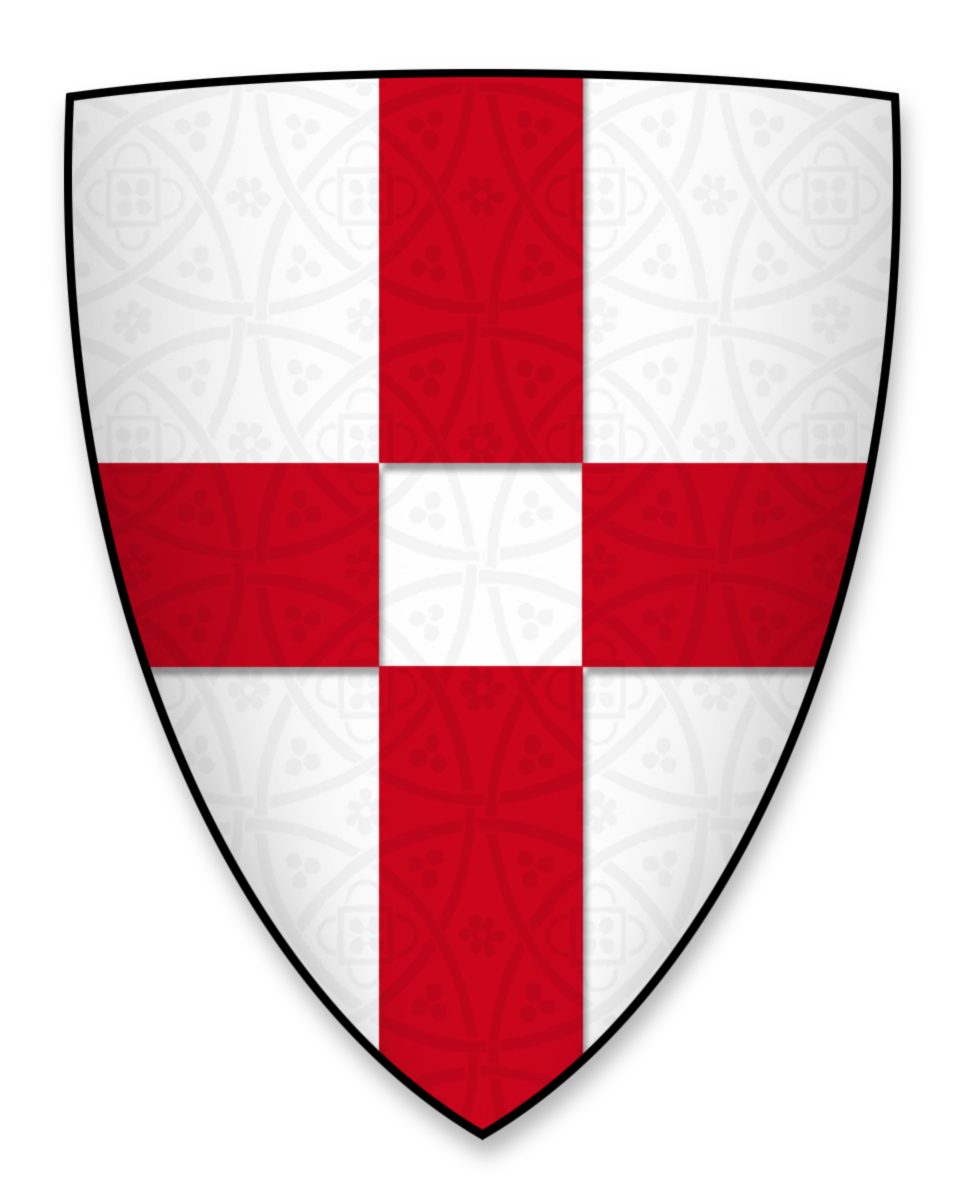
Arms displayed by Stephen Langton, Archbishop of Canterbury, at the signing of Magna Carta in 1215: Argent, a cross quarter-pierced gules

On the death of Hubert Walter, Archbishop of Canterbury, in 1205, the election of a successor encountered difficulties: some of the younger canons of the cathedral chapter elected Reginald, the subprior of Christ Church, Canterbury, as Archbishop while another faction under pressure from King John chose John de Grey, Bishop of Norwich. Both elections were quashed on appeal to Rome, and sixteen canons of the chapter, who had gone to Rome with a mandate to act for the whole chapter, were ordered to proceed to a new election in presence of the Pope. The choice fell upon Langton and he was consecrated by the Pope at Viterbo on 17 June 1207.

There followed a hard political struggle between John of England and Pope Innocent III. The King proclaimed as a public enemy anyone who recognised Stephen as Archbishop. On 15 July 1207, John expelled the Canterbury chapter, which was now unanimous in support of Stephen. In March 1208, Pope Innocent III placed England under an interdict and at the close of 1212, after repeated negotiations had failed, he passed sentence of deposition against John, committing the execution of the sentence to Philip II of France in January 1213.

In May 1213 King John yielded and thus in July, Stephen and his fellow exiles returned to England. Till that moment, he had lived since his consecration at Pontigny Abbey in Burgundy. His first act as Archbishop was to absolve the King, who swore an oath (which he almost immediately violated) guaranteeing that unjust laws should be repealed and the liberties granted by Henry I should be observed.

Stephen now became a leader in the struggle against King John. At a council of churchmen at Westminster on 25 August 1213, to which certain barons were invited, he read the text of the charter of Henry I and called for its renewal. In the sequel, Stephen's energetic leadership and the barons' military strength forced John to grant his seal to Magna Carta (15 June 1215).

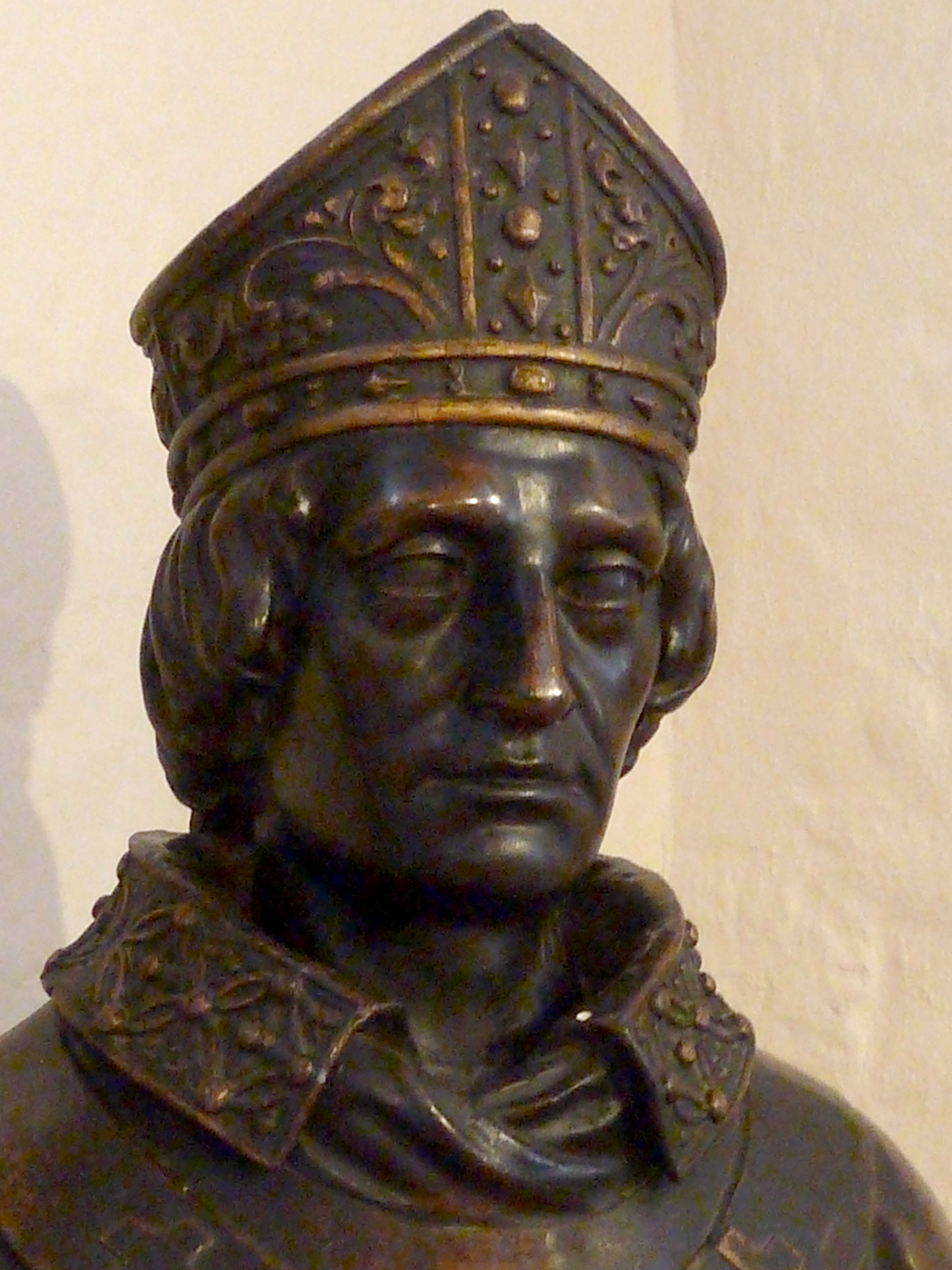
Plaster maquette of Stephen Langton by John Thomas at Canterbury Heritage Museum

Since King John now held his kingdom as a fief of the Holy See the Pope espoused his cause and excommunicated the barons. For refusing to publish the excommunication the king had Stephen suspended from all ecclesiastical functions by the papal commissioners and on 4 November this sentence was confirmed by the Pope, although Stephen appealed to him in person. He was released from suspension the following spring on condition that he keep out of England until peace was restored, and he remained abroad till May 1218. Meanwhile, both Pope Innocent and King John died and all parties in England rallied to the support of Henry III.

Stephen Langton continued under Henry's reign to work for the political independence of England. In 1223 he again appeared as the leader and spokesman of the barons, who demanded that King Henry confirm the charter. He went to France on Henry's behalf to call on Louis VIII of France for the restoration of Normandy, and later he supported Henry against rebellious barons. He obtained a promise from the new pope, Honorius III, that during his lifetime no resident papal legate should be again sent to England, and won other concessions from the same pontiff favourable to the English Church and exalting the see of Canterbury.

Of great importance in the ecclesiastical history of England was a council which Stephen opened at Osney on 17 April 1222; its decrees, known as the Constitutions of Stephen Langton, are the earliest provincial canons which are still recognised as binding in English Church courts.

In 1221 Langton approved the settlement of friars of the Order of Preachers (Blackfriars) in England. They were conveyed by Peter des Roches, the Bishop of Winchester, to Canterbury where the leader of the first group of friars, Gilbert of Fresney, was asked to preach an impromptu sermon on the merits of his new order. Satisfied with his quality of preaching the friars were permitted to found priories across the country.

== Death ==
Stephen Langton died at Slindon, near Chichester, Sussex, on 9 July 1228. He was buried in open ground beside the south transept of Canterbury Cathedral. St Michael's Chapel was later built over this ground (now the Buffs Regimental Chapel), and the head of his tomb projects into the east end of this chapel, under its altar, with the foot outside it.

The "Stephen Langton Trail", devised to celebrate the 800th anniversary of the sealing of Magna Carta, starts in Langton by Wragby and leads to Lincoln Cathedral, close to Lincoln Castle where there is an original copy of the charter.

== Works ==
Langton wrote prolifically. His many sermons and his glosses, commentaries, expositions, and treatises on almost all the books of the Old Testament are preserved in manuscript at Lambeth Palace, at Oxford and Cambridge, and in France.

According to F. J. E. Raby, "There is little reason to doubt that Stephen Langton ... was the author" of the famous sequence Veni Sancte Spiritus.

The only other of his works which has been printed, besides a few letters (in The Historical Works of Gervase of Canterbury, ed. W. Stubbs, ii. London, 1880, Rolls Series, no. 71, appendix to preface) is a Tractatus de translatione Beati Thomae (in J. A. Giles's Thomas of Canterbury, Oxford, 1845), which is probably an expansion of a sermon he preached in 1220, on the occasion of the translation of the relics of Thomas Becket; the ceremony was the most splendid that had ever been seen in England. He also wrote a life of Richard I, and other historical works and poems are attributed to him.

=== Chapters of the Bible ===
Classically, scrolls of the books of the Bible have always been divided by blank spaces at the end (petuhoth) or middle (setumoth) of the lines. However, Langton is believed to be the one who divided the Bible into the standard modern arrangement of chapters. While Cardinal Hugo de Sancto Caro is also known to have come up with a systematic division of the Bible (between 1244 and 1248), it is Langton's arrangement of the chapters that remains in use today.

== Citations ==
Catholic Church titles
Preceded by John de Gray	Archbishop of Canterbury; 1207–1228	Succeeded by Walter d'Eynsham
