= Canu Cadwallon =

Medieval Welsh poems concerning Cadwallon ap Cadfan

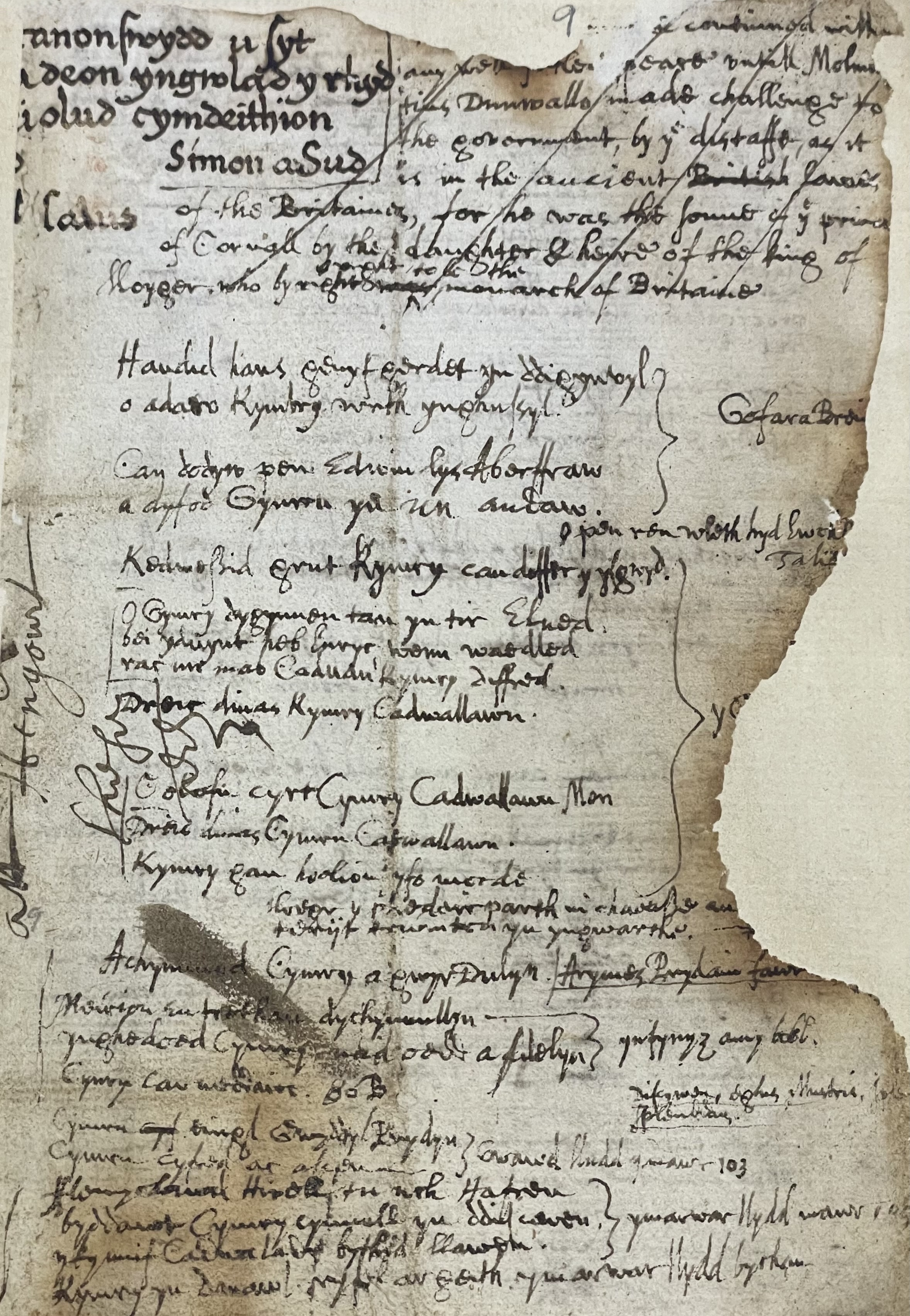
- Seventeenth-century copy of lines from 'Gofara Braint' and 'Moliant Cadwallon', in the hand of Robert Vaughan of Hengwrt (Note: Specifically, this shows ll. i–ii of 'Gofara Braint' and ll. 26b–28, 40, 51i–56iv of 'Moliant Cadwallon', in NLW MS 9094A, p. 9)
- Author(s): Unknown (?Afan Ferddig, 'Moliant Cadwallon') (Note: In this infobox and in the translations below, a question mark before a word or entry indicates that it is uncertain.)
- Compiled by: Robert Vaughan (Hengwrt MS 120)
- Language: Middle Welsh
- Date: ?7th c. ('Moliant Cadwallon' and 'Gofara Braint') ?9th–10th c. ('Englynion Cadwallon')
- Manuscript(s): list: BL Add. MS 14907; BL Add. MS 31055; Hengwrt MS 120 (lost); Jesus College MS 111; NLW MS 9094A; Peniarth MS 111; Peniarth MS 120
- First printed edition: Williams 1933 ('Moliant Cadwallon'); Gruffydd 1978 (collected edition)
- Genre: panegyric, elegiac, and antiquarian poetry
- Setting: Wales, Deira, Bernicia, Elfed
- Period covered: Migration-period Britain
- Personages: Main subjects: Cadwallon ap Cadfan; Edwin of Northumbria Allusions: Einion Yrth; ?Penda; ?Saint Columba; ?Brigantia

Canu Cadwallon (Note: Welsh pronunciation: [ˈkanɨ̞ kadˈwaɬɔn]) (lit. 'the Singing of Cadwallon') is the name given by R. Geraint Gruffydd and subsequent scholars to four Middle Welsh poems concerning Cadwallon ap Cadfan, king of Gwynedd (d. 634 AD). The seventeenth-century antiquarian Robert Vaughan of Hengwrt collected these four poems in a manuscript entitled Y Kynfeirdh Kymreig 'The Earliest Welsh Poets' (Hengwrt MS 120). Although this manuscript is now almost entirely lost, catalogues of Vaughan's library record the titles he gave to all four poems. Three of the poems survive, in whole or in part, in the remnants of this manuscript or in other copies; the fourth, 'I Gadwallon ap Cadfan, brenin Prydain', is known only by its title.

The poem known to modern scholars as 'Moliant Cadwallon' ('Praise of Cadwallon'), which Vaughan called 'Cerdd y Cor a'r Gorres', survives in fifty-six lines. It appears to refer to events just before the Battle of Hatfield Chase (Old Welsh: Gueith Meicen) in 633, as it does not mention Cadwallon's victory over Edwin of Northumbria in that battle. After narrating Cadwallon's expulsion of the English from Gwynedd, the poet exhorts the king to take the fight to Edwin, "set York ablaze" and "kindle fire in the land of Elfed". 'Gofara Braint' survives in only five lines, and refers to Edwin's head being brought to the court of Aberffraw after Hatfield Chase. The third surviving poem, known as 'Marwnad Cadwallon ap Cadfan' or 'Englynion Cadwallon', lists Cadwallon's battles and ends with his death at the Battle of Heavenfield (Old Welsh: Cant Scaul) in 634. It is generally dated to the ninth or tenth century, because of its similarities to other early Welsh 'saga' poetry such as Canu Heledd and Canu Llywarch Hen.

The manuscript remnants do not provide the author of any of the poems, though one of the Welsh Triads names Cadwallon's bard as Afan Ferddig. Excepting one copy of 'Englynion Cadwallon' which survives in the fourteenth-century Red Book of Hergest, the three surviving poems exist only in early modern manuscripts. Nevertheless, scholars of medieval Welsh literature generally regard 'Moliant Cadwallon' as a genuine seventh-century composition, which would make it one of the oldest works in Welsh literature alongside those attributed to Aneirin and Taliesin.

== Historical background ==
Cadwallon ap Cadfan is a very well-attested monarch by the standards of the seventh century in Wales. According to the tenth-century Harleian genealogies, his father was Cadfan ab Iago and his great-great-great-grandfather was Maelgwn Gwynedd. (Note: [§1]: Catgollaun map Catman map Iacob map Beli map Run map Mailcun.) In the fifteenth-century genealogical tract Bonedd yr Arwyr, Cadwallon's mother is given as Tandreg Ddu, daughter of Cynan Garwyn and sister of Selyf ap Cynan, who was slain by Æthelfrith at the Battle of Chester in c. 615. (Note: [§28b]: Mam Gatwallawn ap Katfan, Tandreg ddu ferch Gynan garwyn.) Cadwallon succeeded his father, whose reign Thomas Charles-Edwards dates to c. 616–c. 625. (Note: Charles-Edwards elsewhere gives Cadfan's death as c. 625, and Thornton 2004 likewise gives his floruit as c. 616–c. 625.) Cadfan is commemorated by a surviving Latin inscription at Llangadwaladr in Anglesey. It has been argued that this was set up by Cadwallon's son Cadwaladr, but Charles-Edwards considers it most likely that Cadwallon erected it himself. Besides the poems discussed in this article, the main sources for Cadwallon's life are Adomnán's Vita Columbae (c. 697–700) and Bede's Historia Ecclesiastica gentis Anglorum (c. 731), as well as some entries in the Welsh Annals. Adomnán's account is limited to the events leading up to Cadwallon's death at the battle of Heavenfield.

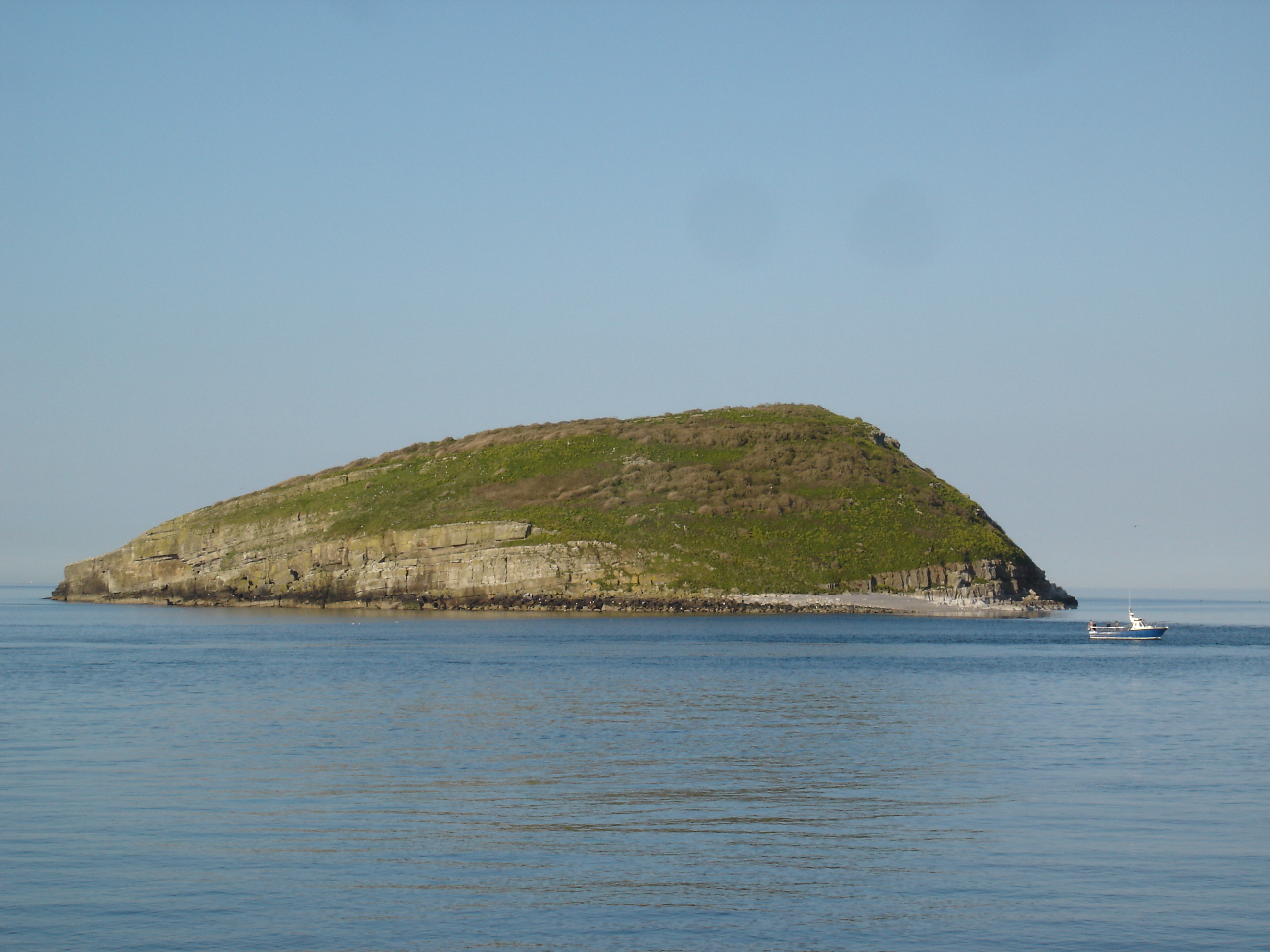
Priestholm (Old Welsh: Glannauc), where the Welsh Annals record a siege of Cadwallon, probably by Edwin

Bede's account of Cadwallon is far from impartial. Cadwallon killed Edwin, the first Christian king of Northumbria, in alliance with the pagan Penda, and for Bede he exemplified the Britons' refusal to recognise the conversion of the English; Charles-Edwards therefore stresses the need for other evidence against which to check Bede's portrayal. Edwin is a main protagonist of Bede's narrative, which records his baptism at Easter 627. Bede reports that Edwin ruled over the Britons as well as the English, and even brought Anglesey and the Isle of Man under English rule. This conquest of Anglesey forms the background to 'Moliant Cadwallon', the first of the poems in Gruffydd's edition of Canu Cadwallon. The Welsh Annals record that Cadwallon was besieged on the island of Glannauc (Priestholm) in 629. Charles-Edwards suggests that this refers to Edwin's attack on Anglesey, and that it belongs to the year before Hatfield, 632 by Bede's reckoning. Some entries in the Welsh Annals before 640, such as Edwin's baptism, are dated too early, and John T. Koch, noting that the Annals place Edwin's death three years too early, suggests that the siege may have taken place two or three years later than 629. Later Welsh traditions suggest that Cadwallon was for a time an exile in Ireland. Koch argues that Cadwallon must have had substantial support in his place of exile. He suggests that sheltering Cadwallon would have suited the same Irish rulers who probably sponsored Oswald and Oswiu, sons of Æthelfrith and therefore dynastic rivals of Edwin, during their exile among the Gaels: the Northern Uí Néill and Dál Riata, the principal secular patrons of Iona Abbey.

Under unclear circumstances, Cadwallon returned to Britain and, together with his junior ally Penda of Mercia, slew Edwin on 12 October 633 at the battle of Hæthfelth, probably Hatfield Chase. Hatfield Chase may have lain within the kingdom of Elfed until its conquest by Edwin in c. 620, and was situated between Deira, Mercia, and Lindsey. The battle is also recorded in the Welsh Annals (as Gueith Meicen), in the Annals of Tigernach, and in the Annals of Inisfallen. Bede refers to Cadwallon's rule over Northumbria as the "ill-omened" year, and calls him a "savage tyrant" of "outrageous tyranny", "even more cruel than the heathen (i.e. Penda)". He even suggests that Cadwallon was "meaning to wipe out the whole English nation from the land of Britain" and "spared neither women nor innocent children". Cadwallon slew Osric, Edwin's cousin and successor in Deira, as well as Edwin's nephew Eanfrith, son of Æthelfrith by Edwin's sister Acha. Eanfrith succeeded Edwin as the ruler of Bernicia, and was slain whilst entreating Cadwallon for peace. (Note: Were Selyf really Cadwallon's uncle, this may also have been revenge for the Battle of Chester in which Eanfrith's father Æthelfrith killed Selyf. More practically, it was a ruthlessly pragmatic destruction of dynastic rivals.)

Ultimately, Cadwallon was in turn killed in autumn 634 by Oswald, Edwin's nephew and Eanfrith's brother. Oswald had spent his exile among the Gaels and become devoted to Iona Abbey, of which Adomnán would later be abbot. According to Adomnán, Columba appeared to Oswald in a dream on the night before the battle and promised that God would grant him victory over Cadwallon, the killer of his uncle Edwin. Oswald returned from exile at the head of an army "small in numbers", but still triumphed. This was at Hefenfeld (Latin: Cælestis campus), recorded as Cantscaul in the Welsh Annals and the Historia Brittonum, where Oswald is called Oswald Lamnguin "O. Bright-blade".

== The manuscripts ==
Robert Vaughan (d. 16 May 1667) was a descendant of Cadwgan, son of Bleddyn ap Cynfyn, and a native of Dolgellau. His maternal uncle Robert Owen mortgaged the manor house of Hengwrt to Vaughan's father, Hywel. Vaughan continued to pursue Welsh antiquities throughout the upheavals of the seventeenth century, and was in contact with other antiquarians of the period such as John Davies, William Maurice, and John Jones of Gellilyfdy. When Jones died in c. 1658, Vaughan acquired all his manuscripts, and built up at Hengwrt what E. D. Jones called "the finest collection of Welsh manuscripts ever assembled by an individual".

According to R. Geraint Gruffydd, Vaughan sought to assemble all the poetry sung to or about Cadwallon. He composed none of these poems himself: they survive because he copied them from older manuscripts into his own collections. Gruffydd's 1978 edition groups the four poems Vaughan collected under the title Canu Cadwallon ('the Singing of Cadwallon'). Of the three poems that survive, 'Moliant Cadwallon' and 'Gofara Braint' are known only from Vaughan's manuscripts and copies derived from them; 'Englynion Cadwallon' also survives independently.

Vaughan compiled one manuscript, Hengwrt MS 120, to collect the earliest specimens of Welsh poetry, and titled it Y Kynfeirdh Kymreig 'The Earliest Welsh Poets'. This manuscript has since been lost, but catalogues of the Hengwrt library written by William Maurice and by Vaughan himself preserve the titles of the poems it contained. Vaughan gave the poems concerning Cadwallon the following titles:

1. 'Gofara [?] Braint'
2. 'Cerdd y Cor a'r Gorres'
3. 'I Gadwallon ap Cadfan, brenin Prydain'
4. 'Marwnad Cadwallon ap Cadfan'

Only two leaves of Hengwrt MS 120 survive, now bound into a manuscript (BL Add. MS 14907) belonging to the eighteenth-century Anglesey antiquary and poet Lewis Morris. These two leaves preserve most of the surviving text of 'Cerdd y Cor a'r Gorres', known to modern scholars as 'Moliant Cadwallon'. A second manuscript in Vaughan's hand, NLW MS 9094A, is a collection of his notebooks on British history. It contains four and a half lines of 'Moliant Cadwallon' that also appear in BL Add. MS 14907, six lines that do not, and five lines of 'Gofara Braint'. Vaughan copied these lines into his notebook because he took them to mention 'Cymru' (Wales) as a place-name, although the word may instead stand for Cymry 'the Welsh', since the two words were spelled identically in Middle Welsh. Two leaves of this manuscript are dated 1652 and 1658, and the later part was probably written while Vaughan was working on a chronology of British history for Archbishop Ussher.

The third poem in Vaughan's list, 'I Gadwallon ap Cadfan, brenin Prydain', is completely lost. The fourth poem, 'Marwnad Cadwallon ap Cadfan', called 'Englynion Cadwallon' by the Celticist Jenny Rowland and subsequent scholars, is the only poem to survive in a complete form, in the fourteenth-century Jesus College MS 111, and in copies made by John Jones of Gellilyfdy (Peniarth MS 111) and Thomas Wiliems (BL Add. MS 31055) from a now-lost part of the White Book of Rhydderch.

== The poems ==
=== 'Moliant Cadwallon' ===
A high tide fills in. It surged forward in ranks of thundering eddies:
the clamorous host of generous Cadwallon. The army returns
of an opponent who is like a stag with wild fire in him,
who very freely gives out battle stallions and the largess of his mead feasting…
There was grumbling since the birth of the profoundly gifted man of the Cymry,
when Christ created Cadwallon.
May God grant protection for His bold high hosts (or the high hosts [going] to Deira),
so that the wind and waves do not exhaust them…
May Cadwallon accomplish something that will be thought about throughout the world
for as long as heaven remains above the surface of the earth.
If there is a high place in Anglesey, he has pitched tents on it,
a man like Maelgwn, [both] generous lords of the land.
He has not negotiated, not at the bidding of the Bernicians,
with Edwin over them as father — that's too much of a big lie…
…In the warband's encampment, the bright lodgings for mounted warriors,
deliverance from the exhaustion of the ship in an enclosure of swords,
the hospitality of Cadwallon on the summit of Caer-Garadog,
as he raises his army to set York ablaze.
The chief men of the stronghold are ready for the sovereign of Britain,
anxious to restore a victorious prince.
He kept the honour of the Cymry by the protection of his shield…
…Let the heathen tribe be gone; they have been driven as far as a briny anointing
Standing before a giant, one may fail to comprehend
what could be higher than you, generous diademed lord,
except the treetops, sky, and stars:
Cadwallon, another Einion: the imperium…
…to kindle fire in the land of Elfed by the Cymry…

— Ll. 1–4, 12–15, 20–25, 34–40, 46–51i. a of 'Moliant Cadwallon', translated by Koch. (Note: For the original text, see here: ⠀: a ches ymleinw taflei tyrrwy ymbyddin.; twruf Catwallawn hael edhwyl uydin; esgar hyd haual a than chwefrin; Rhahawd y adveirch ai radlann medud…; gardei ir pan aned dyn dyuyndawn kymry; Pan rygreas Christ Kadwallawn; As amodwy Duw y dewr orchordon; nys arlludion gwynt a thonnawr; yd wnao Cadwallawn pan gymhwyllo y myd; Tra barhao nef ucheluit lawr; Ossidd art y Mon ryphebyllas; Malgwn hevelit haylon o gwas; nyd ar arch Brineich ny ry dadlas; ac Edwin arnadynt yn dad rwy tulluras…; …yg cattreu gwyn gwesti varchawc; esgor lluded long llann gledyfawc; yspydawd Cadwallawn gaer Garadawc vre; wrth y gyfwyre gynne Efrawc; Kyweir dennmeir yvvneir Prydein; pryder ior udic aduer; kedwessid grut Kymry can differ y ysgwyd…; …ad[aw]ed gynt ethynt <yn> byd irver hallt; rac gawr pallt gorthrycher; a uo uch no thi hael dimynver arglwydd; onid gordeil awyr a ser; Catwallawn [einiawn aral ymher]…; …O Gymru dygynneu tan yn tir Elued…; —Ll. 1–4, 12–15, 20–25, 34–40, 46–51i. a of 'Moliant Cadwallon.)

'Moliant Cadwallon' is the only one of the poems in Canu Cadwallon that is widely considered to be a genuine seventh-century composition (see below). Vaughan entitled it 'Cerdd y Cor a'r Gorres' ('Song of the Dwarf and the Dwarfess') in Hengwrt MS 120, a title that is difficult to understand, as the poem contains no reference to dwarves. Gruffydd suggested that a copyist at some point in the transmission of the poem may have mistaken Efrawc, the Welsh name for York, in line 37 for Efrawg, the father of Peredur, in whose eponymous story a pair of dwarfs prophesy the young knight's future. The Welsh scholar Ifor Williams therefore retitled the poem 'Moliant Cadwallon' ('Praise of Cadwallon'). There are fifty lines of awdlau in BL Add. MS 14907, while six further lines are copied in NLW MS 9094A. Because it survives only in fragments, Gruffydd suggested the original may have had at least eighty lines, though it perhaps had even more.

==== Interpretation ====
The poem begins with a narration of Cadwallon's resistance to Edwin's conquest of Anglesey (ll. 1–27), where it is recalled that "if there is a high place in Anglesey, he has pitched tents on it". The poem portrays Edwin's rule over Gwynedd as oppressive, describing "men killed in lethal combat of fighters who would not submit". This is contrasted with the "hospitality of Cadwallon on the summit of Caer-Garadog", which appears to be going on at the time of the singing of the poem. The Caer-Garadog here is not the present Caer Caradoc in Shropshire, which was first named in the eighteenth century under antiquarian influence, but is probably Caradog in Herefordshire, recorded in 1292 as Cayrcradoc. This hill is three miles north-west of Ross-on-Wye, and so would have been a strategic location for Cadwallon. (Note: [SO 5527]) In the 630s, this hill would have lain in the Welsh kingdom of Ergyng, perhaps then a subkingdom of Gwent. Cadwallon's attack on Edwin does not appear to have been preceded by a recovery of Gwynedd. Instead, he may have gathered his forces near the region of Mercia controlled by Penda. The seemingly spontaneous fighting in Gwynedd would have acted as a diversion, allowing Cadwallon and Penda to strike deep into Northumbria while Edwin was preoccupied in Gwynedd. The poet's urging of Cadwallon to "set York ablaze" and "kindle fire in the land of Elfed" seems to prefigure this campaign, which would end with Edwin's death at Hatfield.

The poet then declares of the Anglo-Saxons: "let the heathen tribe be gone; they have been driven as far as a briny anointing". This is followed by "Cadwallon, another Einion: the imperium." This references Einion Yrth, an early king of Gwynedd and Cadwallon's ancestor. The only apparent deed of note attributed to him, according to the narrative of the Historia Brittonum, was driving out the Irish from Wales, alongside his father, Cunedda. The geographical focus of this stanza is on south-east Wales, with a reference to Portskewett occurring before this comparison, so perhaps this refers to the aftermath of the victory of the philo-Cambrian Penda in the 628 Battle of Cirencester, in which Wessex expansionism had been checked across the Severn Sea. However, considering Einion's legendary act of ethnically cleansing the Irish from Wales, the poet might be urging Cadwallon to emulate his ancestor's actions against the Anglo-Saxons of Northumbria. If this was in agreement with Cadwallon's aims, it may have been the inspiration for Bede's assertion that Cadwallon sought to utterly destroy the Anglo-Saxons. Koch argues that the word ymher in line 50 (derived from and thus translated as Latin imperium) is an echo of Bede's concept of the imperium Britanniae (Old English: Bretwalda), which Edwin was the fifth king to possess. Cadwallon ultimately slew Edwin and assumed this office, while Oswald in turn killed Cadwallon and took the imperium from the king of Gwynedd, though Bede ultimately excluded Cadwallon from his numbering of rulers with this authority.

==== Authorship and dating ====
None of the poems edited as Canu Cadwallon have authors attributed to them in the manuscripts. However, 'Moliant Cadwallon' is the only poem of this collection widely considered to date from the seventh century. This would make the poem among the oldest in the Welsh language, nearly the age of the poems attributed to Aneirin and Taliesin. This judgement is not without criticism, however. The poem says that "Fierce Gwallog caused the greatly renowned death toll at Catraeth". Catraeth is the subject of Y Gododdin, a poem associated with the 'Old North', the Brittonic kingdoms of what is now southern Scotland and northern England. David Dumville remarked in a footnote that the poem probably cannot be taken as contemporary: since, as Kenneth Jackson had noted, it both refers to and echoes the Gododdin, a seventh-century date would mean that this poem of the Old North was already known in Gwynedd by the early 630s. Andrew Breeze replied that every test that can be applied suggests the poem was composed on the eve of the invasion of Northumbria, and that a later poem would be expected to mention Cadwallon's conquest of it. Koch likewise argued that the poet could have known about the battle of Catraeth from other sources, and that the reference would be very apt, as Edwin was likely descended from the Deiran leader in that battle. Alex Woolf considered the poem "far from certainly seventh-century", indeed "demonstrably late", and hypothesised that the Cadwallon in Bede's narrative was not Cadwallon ap Cadfan, but rather Cadwallon Lyw, a shadowy figure in the northern British genealogies. (Note: [§19] Catguallaun Liu map Guitcun map Samuil Pennissel map Pappo Post Priten map Ceneu map Goyl Hen.) However, Koch notes that this theory would mean that not only 'Moliant Cadwallon' but also the Historia Brittonum, the Welsh Annals, and probably the Gwynedd lineage in the Old Welsh genealogies would be ignorant of basic historical facts. Charles-Edwards also rejects Woolf's argument, saying it sees 'in Bede's account implications which, to me, are invisible'. Likewise, Oliver Padel suggests the poem should be seen as literature and not history, in his judgement like all the rest of the Hengerdd.

One of the Welsh Triads names Afan Ferddig ('the little bard', or perhaps 'the favourite bard') as Cadwallon's bard, among the "Three Red-Speared Bards of the Island of Britain". Later court poets knew him as a renowned early poet, and Ifor Williams suggested that part of his work may survive in 'Moliant Cadwallon'.

=== 'Gofara Braint' ===
The title Vaughan gave this poem appears to be a corrupted form, and Gruffydd emends it to 'Gofera Braint', gofera meaning 'overflow'. The poem survives in only five lines in the metre known as cyhydedd naw ban. Vaughan copied four of the lines, which contain the word Cymru, into NLW MS 9094A; the fifth, which names Gwynedd, was copied from Vaughan's manuscript into Peniarth MS 120 by one of Edward Lhuyd's followers.

i. It is easier to proceed without strife
from leaving Wales according to my counsel.
ii. Because Edwin's head came to Aberffraw's court
and [all] Wales became one assembly.
iii. Gwynedd brought joy to the Britons.

— 'Gofara Braint', translated from Gruffydd's modern Welsh paraphrase. (Note: For the original text, see here: ⠀: i. Handid haus genyf gerdet yn ddigynvyl; o adaw Kymbry wrth ynghussyl; ii. Can dodyw pen Edwin lys Aberffraw; a dyfod Cymru yn un andaw; iii. Neus duc Gwynedd gorvoled i Vrython; —'Gofara Braint', from NLW MS 9094A (i, ii) and Peniarth MS 120 (iii).)

==== Interpretation ====
This poem is important for a number of reasons. It flatly contradicts the testimony of Bede, who says that Edwin's head was brought to York Minster after his death. Gruffydd thought that the personal note in the first couplet, together with this contradiction of Bede, suggests that the poem may be later than the seventh century, though he did not consider this certain; he also observed that the spelling of the surviving lines points to no exemplar earlier than the fourteenth century. Rowland, however, notes that although Bede implies that the head was brought to York directly after the battle, his chronology is by no means certain. Given the disruption that Northumbria faced after the deaths of Edwin and his relatives and the flight of their royal family, it seems most likely that Edwin's head was not brought to York Minster until Oswald's reign, which would make the series of events narrated in 'Gofara Braint' plausible. If this poem genuinely dates from the seventh century, it would also be one of the earliest references to Aberffraw as the chief court of the kings of Gwynedd, together with 'Marwnad Cynddylan'.

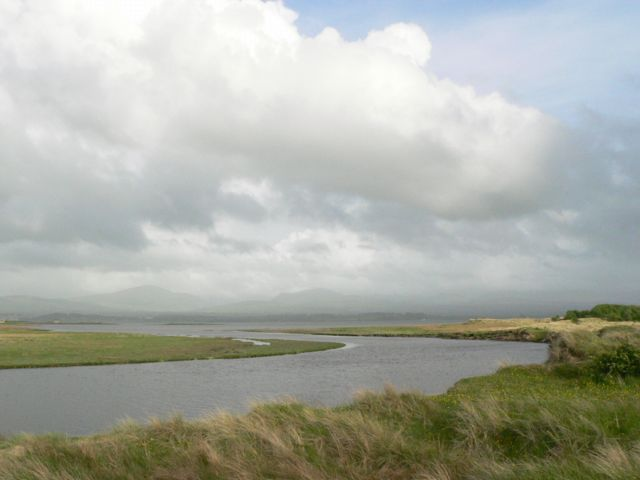
The mouth of the Braint at high tide, facing south towards Arfon and Snowdonia (Eryri)

If Gruffydd's emendation is correct, the title refers to the river Braint in Anglesey overflowing. The surviving five lines do not say why, but Gruffydd tentatively connected the river with the fountain that flows in the stanza of 'Englynion Cadwallon' lamenting Cadwallon's death, and Koch interprets the poem as describing the Braint overflowing in response to the king's death. Rowland, on the other hand, notes that rivers overflowing with the blood of the slain are a common image, and suggests that the words ellwng oed vreint in the second stanza of 'Englynion Cadwallon' may allude to the same river and to this poem. The river Braint is not far from the royal centre of Aberffraw, and shares its name with the goddess Brigantia; both names ultimately derive from Proto-Celtic *brigantī. Other rivers in Britain are named after Celtic goddesses, such as the Aeron, named for *Agronā, 'the goddess of slaughter and battle'. It has been argued that the Welsh word for 'king', brenin, originally referred to the ruler who was in a hieros gamos with the goddess, and who was afterwards called *brigantīnos, the male counterpart of Brigantia. If this theory is true, the river Braint overflowing with grief may represent a memory in the Christian era of the idea of the land being personified by a sovereignty goddess, here Brigantia, who mourns for the death of her mortal consort.

=== 'Englynion Cadwallon' ===
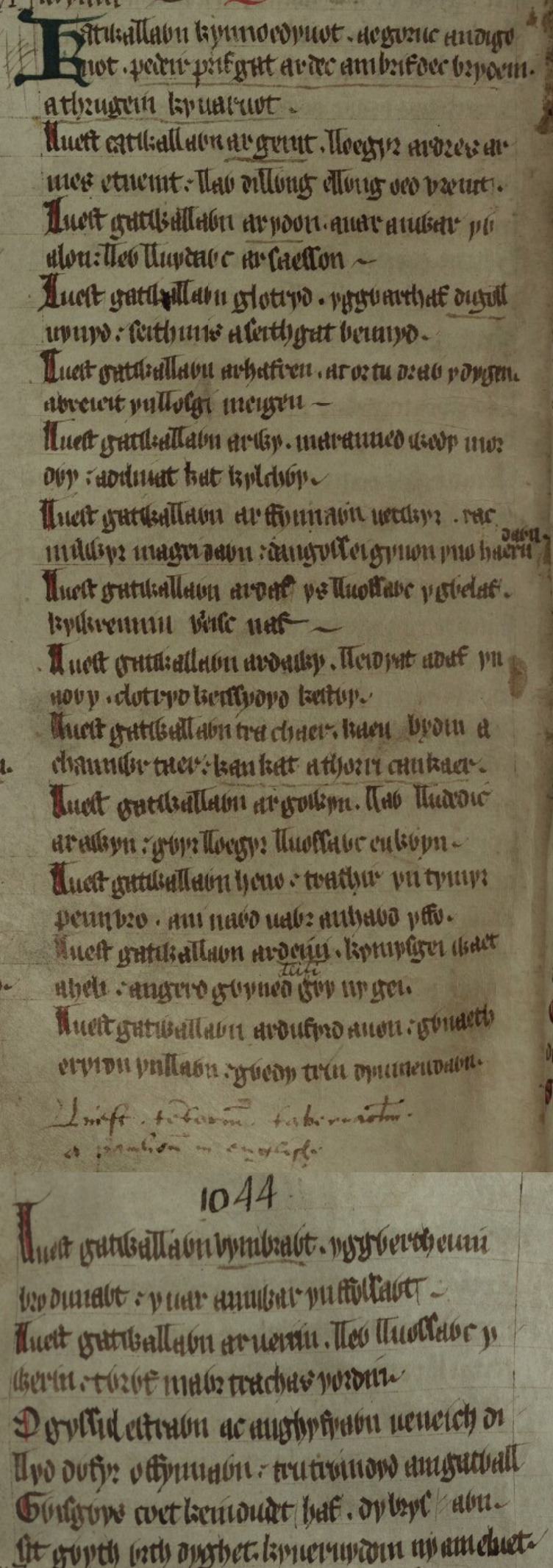
The text of the poem from the Red Book of Hergest, ff. 259^{r}–260^{v}

This poem was called 'Marwnad Cadwallon ap Cadfan' by Vaughan, as he understood it to be an elegy for Cadwallon. It is also the only poem in Canu Cadwallon to survive in a medieval manuscript, as it is found in the Red Book of Hergest. However, Rowland edits and translates the poem as 'Englynion Cadwallon' (englynion being short stanzas in a traditional Welsh metre), a name followed by most subsequent scholars, though Koch refers to it as 'Marwnad Cadwallon' in his edition of 'Moliant Cadwallon'. Rowland considers that it might better be classed as antiquarian verse than as saga: its main purpose is to preserve a list of Cadwallon's chief battles, and its chief claim to a place in the saga tradition is that it is "an eclectic marwnad which replaces praise with battle listing". Gruffydd placed it among the narrative englynion of Canu Llywarch Hen and Canu Heledd, usually dated to the ninth and tenth centuries, and Rowland assigns it to a group of saga englynion that she dates from the mid to late ninth century. This catalogue is fifty-five lines in eighteen stanzas: an englyn unodl crwca, followed by fourteen englynion milwr and three englynion penfyr (stanzas 7, 14 and 17). Rowland argues that the eighteenth stanza was not originally part of the poem. Gruffydd observed that the battles are listed in a clockwise circuit of Wales, and Rowland accordingly suggests that the list may represent a symbolic claim to overlordship of the country. This desire for a preeminent status over the Welsh is also reflected in 'Moliant Cadwallon'. In stanza 15, the speaker calls Cadwallon vym brawt 'my brother', and so Gruffydd understood the speaker to have a similar narrative role to Heledd, who mourns her brother in the saga englynion known as Canu Heledd. However, Rowland notes that brawt can also mean 'brother-in-arms, comrade', so a family relationship between the speaker and Cadwallon need not be assumed.

A considerable body of tradition about Cadwallon circulated in the early Middle Ages. This poem appears to make reference to some stories which are now lost, and the battles do not appear to be arranged in chronological order. Koch suggests that the poem derived much of its information from 'Moliant Cadwallon', but notes that it is impossible to tell whether the lost poems 'Gofara Braint' and 'I Gadwallon ap Cadfan, brenin Prydain' also contributed to its content. The only battles about which much can be said are those related to Cadwallon's campaign against Edwin. The second stanza mentions a battle 'by the Caint', which is identified with the Ceint, a tributary of the River Cefni in Anglesey. The third stanza mentions the 'Idon', probably to be identified with the River Eden in Cumberland. The fourth and fifth stanzas place Cadwallon on the summit of Digoll (Long Mountain) and by the Severn opposite Breiddin, at "the burning of Meigen". Rowland associates these with a campaign against Edwin in Powys that is also remembered in the Welsh Triads, and suggests that the Welsh Annals and the Historia Brittonum, which call the battle in which Edwin died Gueith Meicen, confused this earlier victory with Hatfield Chase. The 'land of Dunawd' in the fifteenth stanza is probably Dunoding in north Wales, though if the stanza refers to a battle in the north of Britain it may be the land of Dunod ap Pabo. For the sixteenth stanza's ar ueirin, Rowland suggests reading tra merin 'beyond the sea', which could refer either to Cadwallon's Irish exile or to a seaborne attack on North Britain. Haycock compares tra Merin Reget 'beyond the sea of Rheged' in a prophetic poem in the Book of Taliesin, though she cautions that not every occurrence of tra merin need refer to the North. All other stanzas of the poem not presented below refer to Cadwallon's battles in Wales, but these are difficult to reconcile with what is known of his chronology and activities, so they may be purely figurative claims of overlordship.

Cadwallon before his ?death
achieved ?our success:
fourteen chief battles around great, fair Britain and sixty clashes.
The encampment of Cadwallon by the Caint:
England in affliction, ?tribulation from birds of prey,
a releasing hand – letting go was a privilege.
The encampment of Cadwallon by the Idon:
ungentle grief to his enemies,
a lion with hosts against the Saxons.
The encampment of fameworthy Cadwallon
on the summit of Digoll Mountain:
seven months with seven battles daily.
The encampment of Cadwallon by the Severn
and from the opposite side to Dygen
Freiddin the burning of Meigen…
The encampment of Cadwallon my brother
on the heights of Dunawd's land:
his anger was not gentle in battle.
The encampment of Cadwallon by Meirin:
a lion with numerous soldiers,
a great host, very cruel its assault.
Because of the counsel of a foreigner and unrighteous monks
water flows from a fountain.
Wretched the day of mourning for Cadwallon.

— Stanzas 1–5, 15–17 of 'Englynion Cadwallon', translated by Rowland. (Note: A question mark before a word indicates that Rowland regards its translation as uncertain.) (Note: For the original text, see here: ⠀: Katwallawn kyn noe dyuot.; ae goruc an digonot.; pedeir prifgat ar dec am brifdec brydein.; a thrugein kyuaruot.; Lluest catwallawn ar geint.; lloegyr ar dres armes etneint.; llaw dillwng ellwng oed vreint.; Lluest gatwallawn ar ydon.; auar anwar yw alon.; llew lluydawc ar saesson.; Lluest gatwallawn glotryd.; yg gwarthaf digoll uynyd.; seithmis a seith gat beunyd.; Lluest gatwallawn ar hafren.; ac or tu draw y dygen.; [breitin] llosgi meigen…; Lluest gatwallawn vym brawt.; yg gwertheuin bro dunawt.; y uar annwar yn ffossawt.; Lluest gatwallawn ar ueirin.; llew lluossawc y werin.; twrwf mawr trachas y ordin.; O gyssul estrawn ac anghyfyawn ueneich; dillyd dwfyr o ffynnawn.; tru trwmdyd am gatwallawn.; Gwisgwys coet keindudet; haf. dybryssit gwyth wrth dyghet; kyueruydom ny am eluet.; —Stanzas 1–5, 15–17 of 'Englynion Cadwallon'.)

Rowland takes the seventeenth stanza to refer to Cadwallon's death, which came at Heavenfield. Koch, by contrast, reads the poem as written from the perspective of a living Cadwallon on the verge of attacking Northumbria. The reference to water flowing from a fountain may hint at a tradition in which Cadwallon was held to be a saint, and he is indeed called bendigeit 'blessed' in one of the Welsh Triads. No other source gives Cadwallon this epithet, though it is often given to his son Cadwaladr, and Bromwich suggests that the two may have been confused. In Welsh hagiography, fountains were said to have sprung from places where a saint or innocent was slain. The references to the 'counsel of a foreigner' and 'unrighteous monks' are also difficult to interpret. The former probably lays blame on Penda, Cadwallon's Anglo-Saxon ally, for the events of the battle, though whether through treachery or misjudgement is unknown. Gruffydd thought it referred to the intervention by Saint Columba recorded in Adomnán's Vita Columbae. However, Rowland notes that this story does not seem to have been particularly widespread, and suggests that 'monks' may be a contemptuous name for the pious Northumbrian army under Edwin and Oswald, noting that Oswald held a religious ceremony before the battle. It may also be that these monks ill-advised, betrayed, or even cursed Cadwallon, as he is similarly cursed by Beuno in that saint's Life.

== Bibliography ==
=== Editions and translations ===
- Breeze, Andrew (2001). "Seventh-century Northumbria and a poem to Cadwallon". Northern History. 38. Taylor & Francis: 145–152. doi:10.1179/nhi.2001.38.1.145.
- Gruffydd, R. Geraint (1978). "Canu Cadwallon ap Cadfan". In Bromwich, Rachel; Jones, R. Brinley (eds.). Astudiaethau ar yr Hengerdd: Studies in Old Welsh Poetry (in Welsh). Cardiff: University of Wales Press. pp. 25–43. ISBN 9780708306963.
- Koch, John T., ed. (2013). Cunedda, Cynan, Cadwallon, Cynddylan: Four Welsh Poems and Britain 383–655. Aberystwyth: Centre for Advanced Welsh and Celtic Studies. ISBN 9781907029134.
- Rowland, Jenny, ed. (1990). Early Welsh Saga Poetry: A Study and Edition of the Englynion. Cambridge: D. S. Brewer. ISBN 9780859912754.

=== Secondary sources, historical sources, and commentaries ===
- Anderson, Alan Orr; Anderson, Marjorie Ogilvie, eds. (1991). Adomnán's Life of Columba. Oxford: Clarendon Press.
- Bartrum, Peter (1959). "Bonedd yr Arwyr". Bulletin of the Board of Celtic Studies. 18. University of Wales Press: 229–252.
  Bartrum, Peter, ed. (1966). Early Welsh Genealogical Tracts. Cardiff: University of Wales Press.
- Binchy, D. A. (1970). Celtic and Anglo-Saxon Kingship: The O'Donnell Lectures for 1967-8; Delivered in the University of Oxford on 23 and 24 May 1968. Oxford: Clarendon Press. ISBN 0198152132.
- Bromwich, Rachel, ed. (2014). Trioedd Ynys Prydein: The Triads of the Island of Britain (4th ed.). Cardiff: University of Wales Press. ISBN 9781783161454.
- Charles-Edwards, Thomas (1974). "Native Political Organisation in Roman Britain and the Origins of Middle Welsh Brenhin". In Meyrhofer, Manfred; Meid, Wolfgang; Güntert, Hermann (eds.). Antiquitates Indogermanicae. Studien zur indogermanischen Altertumskunde und zur Sprach- und Kulturgeschichte der indogermanischen Völker. Gedenkschrift für Hermann Güntert zur 25. Wiederkehr seines Todestages am 23. April 1973 (in German). Innsbruck: Institut für Sprachwissenschaft. pp. 35–45. ISBN 3851245202.
  —— (2004). "Cadwallon [Cædwalla] ap Cadfan (d. 634), king of Gwynedd". Oxford Dictionary of National Biography (online ed.). Oxford University Press. doi:10.1093/ref:odnb/4322. (Subscription, Wikipedia Library access or UK public library membership required.)
  —— (2013). Wales and the Britons, 350–1064. Oxford: Oxford University Press. ISBN 9780198217312. IA walesbritons35010000char.
- Colgrave, Bertram; Mynors, R. A. B., eds. (1969). Bede's Ecclesiastical History of the English People. Oxford: Clarendon Press. IA x-bede-s-ecclesiastical-history.
- Dumville, David (1988). "Early Welsh poetry: problems of historicity". In Roberts, Brynley F. (ed.). Early Welsh Poetry: Studies in the Book of Aneirin. Aberystwyth: National Library of Wales. pp. 1–16. ISBN 090715834X.
- Ekwall, Eilert (1960). The Concise Oxford Dictionary of English Place-Names (4th ed.). Oxford: Oxford University Press.
- Goetinck, Glenys Witchard (1976). Historia Peredur vab Efrawg. Cardiff: University of Wales Press. ISBN 9780708326206.
- Guy, Ben (2020). Medieval Welsh Genealogy: an Introduction and Textual Study. Woodbridge: Boydell Press. doi:10.1017/9781787448988. ISBN 9781783275137.
- Haycock, Marged (2007). Legendary Poems from the Book of Taliesin. Aberystwyth: CMCS Publications. ISBN 9780955718281.
  —— (2013a). Prophecies from the Book of Taliesin. Aberystwyth: CMCS Publications. ISBN 9780955718274.
  —— (2013b). "Early Welsh Poets Look North". In Woolf, Alex (ed.). Beyond the Gododdin: Dark Age Scotland in Medieval Wales. St Andrews: Committee for Dark Ages Studies. pp. 9–40. ISBN 9780951257388.
- Huws, Daniel (2000). Medieval Welsh Manuscripts. Aberystwyth: National Library of Wales. ISBN 0708316026.
  —— (2022). A Repertory of Welsh Manuscripts and Scribes c.800 – c.1800. Vol. 1. Aberystwyth: Centre for Advanced Welsh and Celtic Studies / National Library of Wales. ISBN 978-1862251212.
- Jackson, Kenneth (1969). The Gododdin: the Oldest Scottish Poem. Edinburgh: Edinburgh University Press. ISBN 9780852240496.
- Jarman, A. O. H. (1988). Y Gododdin: Britain's Oldest Heroic Poem. Llandysul: Gomer Press. ISBN 0863833543.
- Jones, Evan David (1959). "VAUGHAN, ROBERT (1592? – 1667), antiquary, collector of the famous Hengwrt library". Dictionary of Welsh Biography. National Library of Wales.
- Koch, John T., ed. (1997). The Gododdin of Aneirin: Text and Context from Dark-Age North Britain (PDF). Cardiff: University of Wales Press. ISBN 9780708313749. Archived from the original on 4 April 2025.
  ——, ed. (2006). Celtic Culture: A Historical Encyclopedia. Santa Barbara: ABC-CLIO. ISBN 9781851094400.
- Morris, John, ed. (1980). Nennius: British History and The Welsh Annals. London: Phillimore. ISBN 9780847662647.
- Padel, Oliver (2013). "Aneirin and Taliesin: Sceptical Speculations". In Woolf, Alex (ed.). Beyond the Gododdin: Dark Age Scotland in Medieval Wales. St Andrews: Committee for Dark Ages Studies. pp. 115–52. ISBN 9780951257388.
- Parry, Thomas (1979) [First published 1944]. Hanes Llenyddiaeth Gymraeg hyd 1900 (in Welsh). Cardiff: University of Wales Press. ISBN 9780708307281.
- Rodway, Simon (2013). Dating Medieval Welsh Literature: Evidence from the Verbal System. Aberystwyth: CMCS Publications. ISBN 9780955718250.
- Rowland, Jenny (2003). "Y Beirdd Enwog: Anhysbys a'i Cant". In Daniel, R. Iestyn; Haycock, Marged; Rowland, Jenny; Johnston, Dafydd (eds.). Cyfoeth y Testun: Ysgrifau ar Lenyddiaeth Gymraeg yr Oesoedd Canol (in Welsh). Cardiff: University of Wales Press. pp. 31–49. ISBN 9780708318270.
- Sims-Williams, Patrick (2018). Buchedd Beuno: the Middle Welsh Life of St Beuno. Dublin: Dublin Institute for Advanced Studies. ISBN 978-1855002364.
- Thomas, Graham C. G. (1970). "Dryll o Hen Lyfr Ysgrifen". Bulletin of the Board of Celtic Studies (in Welsh). 23. University of Wales Press: 309–16.
  —— (1976). "Llinellau o Gerddi i Gadwallon ap Cadfan". Bulletin of the Board of Celtic Studies (in Welsh). 26. University of Wales Press: 406–10.
- Thomas, Rebecca (2022). History and Identity in Early Medieval Wales. Cambridge: D. S. Brewer. ISBN 9781843846277.
- Thomas, R. J.; Bevan, G. A.; Donovan, P. J.; Hawke, A., eds. (2024). "Geiriadur Prifysgol Cymru Ar Lein". Geiriadur Prifysgol Cymru (in Welsh). Aberystwyth: Centre for Advanced Welsh & Celtic Studies.
- Thornton, David E. (2004). "Cadfan ab Iago (fl. c. 616–c. 625), king of Gwynedd". Oxford Dictionary of National Biography (online ed.). Oxford University Press. doi:10.1093/ref:odnb/4314. (Subscription, Wikipedia Library access or UK public library membership required.)
- Williams, Ifor (1933). "Hengerdd: Moliant Cadwallon; Darogan". Bulletin of the Board of Celtic Studies (in Welsh). 7. University of Wales Press: 23–32.
  ——, ed. (1938). Canu Aneirin (in Welsh). Cardiff: University of Wales Press.
  ——, ed. (1968). The Poems of Taliesin. Translated by Williams, J. E. Caerwyn. Dublin: Institute for Advanced Studies. ISBN 9780901282019.
- Woolf, Alex (2004). "Caedualla Rex Brettonum and the Passing of the Old North". Northern History. 41. Taylor & Francis: 5–24. doi:10.1179/nhi.2004.41.1.5.
