= Battle of Heavenfield =

630's battle in Northumberland

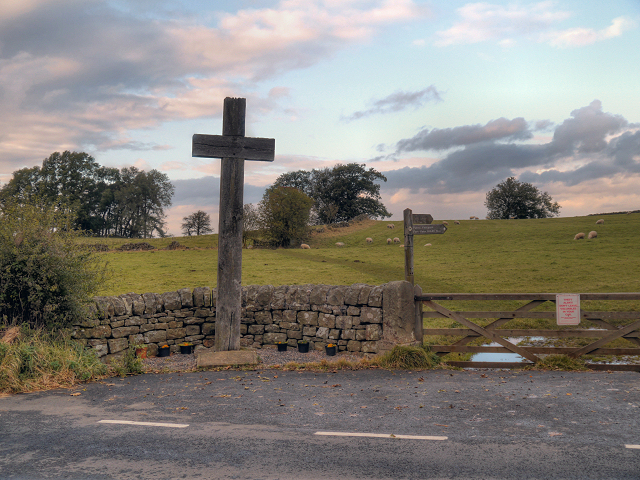
- Heavenfield: cross and battlefield
Date	633 or 634
Location	near Hexham (today part of Northumberland, England) 55°01′13″N 2°06′02″W
Result	Northumbrian victory

Belligerents
Kingdom of Northumbria Possible support: *Kingdom of Rheged *Kingdom of Dál Riata	Kingdom of Gwynedd

Commanders and leaders
King Oswald	Cadwallon ap Cadfan †

Strength
700	1,000

Casualties and losses
less than 200 killed	800 killed

The Battle of Heavenfield was fought in 633 or 634 between a Northumbrian army under Oswald of Bernicia and a Welsh army under Cadwallon ap Cadfan of Gwynedd. The battle resulted in a decisive Northumbrian victory. The Annales Cambriae (Annals of Wales) record the battle as Bellum Cantscaul in 631. Bede referred to it as the Battle of Deniseburna near Hefenfelth.

== Background ==
An alliance between Cadwallon of Gwynedd and King Penda of Mercia had led to an invasion of Northumbria. This was an odd alliance between a Christian king of Brythonic descent and a pagan king of Anglian descent. At the Battle of Hatfield Chase on 12 October 633, the invading Welsh and Mercians had killed Northumbrian king Edwin and Northumbria was split between its two sub-kingdoms, Bernicia and Deira. Cadwallon's army laid waste to Northumbria.

Eanfrith, who had been exiled under Edwin, became king of Bernicia, while Deira was ruled by Osric, a cousin of Edwin. According to Bede, Osric was killed by Cadwallon whilst trying to besiege him in the summer of 633, after which Cadwallon ruled both regions as a tyrant. Eanfrith's reign was short, as he was killed by Cadwallon after leaving Bernicia to negotiate peace later in the year. Eanfrith's brother, Oswald, then returned from seventeen years of exile, possibly including time spent in Dál Riata, to claim the crown of Bernicia.

== Battle ==
It seems that the Welsh army advanced northwards from York along the line of Dere Street. Oswald's forces took up a defensive position beside the Roman Wall, about 4 miles (6 km) north of Hexham. It was claimed that the night before the battle, Oswald had a vision of Saint Columba, in which the saint foretold that Oswald would be victorious. Oswald placed his army so that it was facing east, with its flanks shielded by Brady's Crag to the north and the Wall to the south. According to Bede, Oswald raised a cross, and prayed for victory alongside his troops.

It is believed that the Welsh had greater numbers, but they were forced to attack from the east along the narrow front between the Wall and Brady's Crag, where they were hemmed in and unable to outflank the Northumbrians. It is not known how long the battle lasted or what the losses were, but the Welsh line finally broke. This began a headlong flight southwards by the Welsh, pursued by the vengeful Northumbrians. Many Welsh soldiers were cut down as they ran, and according to Bede, Cadwallon was caught around 10 miles (16 km) south of Heavenfield and killed at a place called Denisesburna ('Brook of Denisus'), now identified as the Rowley Burn (sometimes Rowley Brook) near Whitley Chapel.

Afterwards, due to the miraculous victory by Oswald's smaller force, the main battle site became known as Heavenfield (Heofenfeld) and became a place of pilgrimage for Christians at the time.

== Aftermath ==
After the battle, Oswald re-united Deira with Bernicia and became king of all Northumbria. Bede believed that the importance of the battle was that it restored Christianity to Northumbria. Oswald spent eight years upon the Northumbrian throne before he was killed in the Battle of Maserfield. Oswald was succeeded as king of Northumbria by his brother Oswiu.

== Site today ==
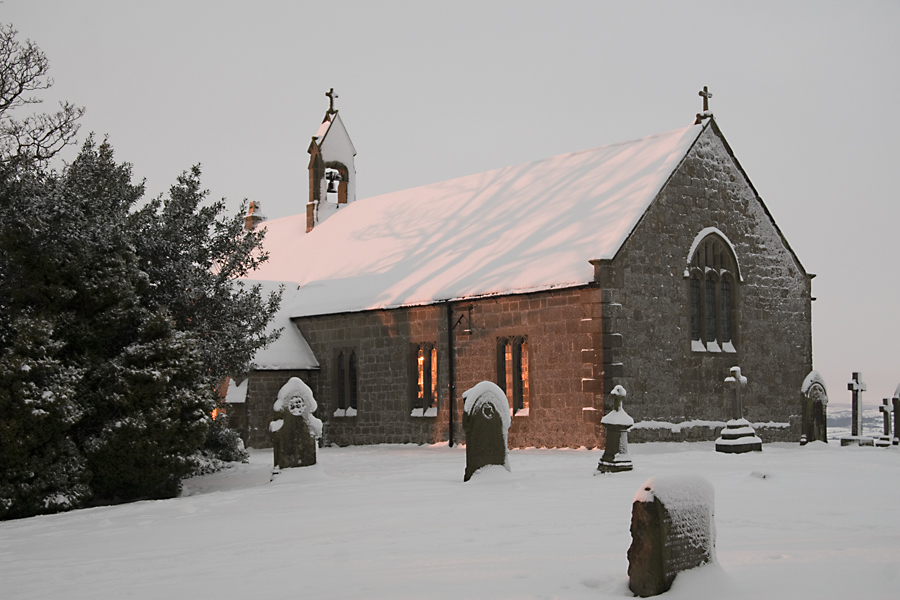
St Oswald's Church, Heavenfield

The road east of Chollerford that runs alongside the Roman Wall (B6318) has a wooden cross standing alongside it to mark the site of the Battle of Heavenfield. On the hill to the north of the cross stands St Oswald's Church, Heavenfield, marking the spot where Oswald was believed to have raised his battle standard. The site is around 2.8 miles (4.5 km) east of the River North Tyne.

Another possibility is near Devil's Water, as per Max Adams; Bede names the site as Denisesburn, now known to be close to Devil's Water, per a 1233 charter to Thomas of Whittington discovered in 1864 (Tom Corfe, 1997). Adams posits that the battle began on the east bank of Devil's Water, moving to the ford at Peth Foot.

The GPC dictionary of the Welsh language shows the word cant meaning a circular enclosure and the word ysgawl meaning warrior or hero.

St Oswald's featured in an episode of Vera (series 10, episode entitled Dirty).

== In fiction ==
The Battle of Heavenfield is a major event in the plot of Menewood by Nicola Griffith, a 2023 historical fiction novel about the life of Saint Hilda of Whitby. Griffith created Hild's fictional role in the battle, in part, to explain Oswald's unlikely victory.
