= Battle of the River Idle =

Early 7th-century battle in England

Date	c. 616
Location	River Idle
Result	East Anglian victory

Belligerents
Northumbria	East Anglia

Commanders and leaders
Æthelfrith of Northumbria †	Rædwald of East Anglia; Edwin of Northumbria; Rægenhere †

The Battle of the River Idle was a major victory for Rædwald of East Anglia over Æthelfrith of Northumbria in 616 in what is now Nottinghamshire.

== Background ==
Æthelfrith was King of Bernicia from c. 593. Around 604 under unknown circumstances, he gained control of neighbouring Deira, and forced into exile two notable members of the Deiran royal family, Edwin, son of the former king Ælla, and Hereric, Edwin's nephew.

Hereric was poisoned while at the court of Ceretic, king of Elmet. It was probably Æthelfrith who is to blame for this killing. The second exile, Edwin, ended up eventually under the protection of Rædwald in East Anglia. Æthelfrith sent messengers to Rædwald asking him to kill Edwin. Rædwald did not comply, and instead, he raised an army to confront Æthelfrith.

== Battle ==
Rædwald assembled an army and marched north, accompanied by his son Rægenhere, to confront Æthelfrith. They met on the western boundary of the kingdom of Lindsey, on the east bank of the River Idle. The battle was fierce and was long commemorated in the saying, 'The river Idle was foul with the blood of Englishmen'. During the fighting, Æthelfrith and Rædwald's son Rægenhere were both slain. Edwin then succeeded Æthelfrith as the king of Northumbria, and Æthelfrith's sons were subsequently forced into exile.

A separate account of the battle, given by Henry of Huntingdon, stated that Rædwald's army was split into three formations, led by Rædwald, Rægenhere, and Edwin. With more experienced fighters, Æthelfrith attacked in loose formation. At the sight of Rægenhere, perhaps thinking he was Edwin, Æthelfrith's men cut their way through to him and slew him. After the death of his son, Rædwald furiously breached his lines, killing Æthelfrith amid a great slaughter of the Northumbrians.

== Aftermath ==
While presented by Bede as being fought simply over the issue of Edwin, this war may have actually involved issues of power and territory between the two rulers. D.P. Kirby has argued that the battle was more than a clash between two kings over the treatment of an exiled nobleman but was "part of a protracted struggle to determine the military and political leadership of the Anglian peoples" at that time. After the Æthelfrith's death, Edwin became king of both kingdoms, Deira and Bernicia, and this time in return, Æthelfrith's sons Eanfrith, Oswald, and Oswiu fled to the north. (Note: Bede mentions the exile of Æthelfrith's sons among the Scots and Picts); Anglo-Saxon Chronicle, manuscript (E) lists the following sons of Æthelfrith: Eanfrith, Oswald, Oswiu, Oslac, Oswudu, Oslaf and Offa.)

== Sources ==
- Henry of Huntingdon (1853). "The chronicle of Henry of Huntingdon". Translated by Forrester, Thomas. Internet Archive.
- Hunt, William (1896). "Redwald" . In Lee, Sidney (ed.). Dictionary of National Biography. Vol. 47. London: Smith, Elder & Co.
- Kirby, D.P. (2000). The Earliest English Kings. London and New York: Routledge. ISBN 978-0-415-09086-5.
- Newton, S. (2003). The Reckoning of King Rædwald. Brightlingsea.
