= Cadwallon ap Cadfan =

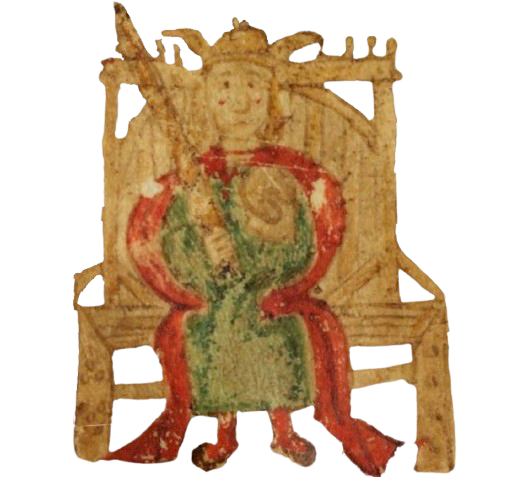
- Cadwallon ap Cadfan, from Peniarth 23C

King of Gwynedd
- Reign: c. 625 – 634
- Predecessor: Cadfan ap Iago
- Successor: Cadafael
- Died: 634 (Battle of Heavenfield)
- Issue: Cadwaladr
- House: House of Gwynedd
- Father: Cadfan ap Iago

Cadwallon ap Cadfan (died 634) was the King of Gwynedd from around 625 until his death in battle. The son and successor of Cadfan ap Iago, he is best remembered as the King of the Britons who invaded and conquered Northumbria, defeating and killing its king, Edwin, prior to his own death in battle against Oswald of Bernicia. His joint conquest of Northumbria with Penda of Mercia following Edwin's death in 633 allowed Cadwallon to control the kingdom until 634, making him one of the last recorded Celtic Britons to hold substantial territory in eastern Britain until the rise of the Welsh House of Tudor. He was thereafter remembered as a national hero by the Britons and as a tyrant by the Anglo-Saxons of Northumbria. Uniquely among seventh-century Welsh monarchs, Cadwallon also has three poems associated with him, which may be contemporaneous to his lifetime.

== History ==
As with other figures of the era, little is certainly known of Cadwallon's early life or reign. The primary source of information about him is the Ecclesiastical History of the English People of the Anglo-Saxon writer Bede, who is strongly critical of him. Cadwallon consistently appears in the genealogies of the Kings of Gwynedd as the son of Cadfan ap Iago and a descendant of Maelgwn Gwynedd and Cunedda. Historian Alex Woolf, however, presents the case that the genealogists have erroneously inserted Bede's Cadwallon into the pedigree of the unrelated Kings of Gwynedd as son of Cadfan. Instead, Woolf suggests that Bede's Cadwallon was the Catguallaun liu found in genealogies as son of Guitcun and grandson of Sawyl Penuchel, rulers in the Hen Ogledd or Brythonic-speaking area of northern Britain.

Cadwallon was affected by the ambitions of Edwin, King of Northumbria. Bede, writing about a century after Cadwallon's death, describes Edwin, the most powerful king in Britain, conquering the Brittonic kingdom of Elmet (now western Yorkshire) and ejecting its king, Cerdic. This opened the door to the Irish Sea, and Edwin successfully extended his rule to the "Mevanian Islands" – the Isle of Man and Anglesey. The Annales Cambriae says that Cadwallon was besieged at Glannauc (now Puffin Island, a small island off eastern Anglesey), and dates this to 629. Surviving Welsh poetry and the Welsh Triads portray Cadwallon as a heroic leader against Edwin. They refer to a battle at Digoll (Long Mountain) and mention that Cadwallon spent time in Ireland before returning to Britain to defeat Edwin.

According to Geoffrey of Monmouth's Historia Regum Britanniae (which includes a fairly extensive account of Cadwallon's life but is largely legendary — for example, Geoffrey has Cadwallon surviving until after the Battle of the Winwaed in 654 or 655), Cadwallon went to Ireland and then to the island of Guernsey. From there, according to Geoffrey, Cadwallon led an army into Dumnonia, where he encountered and defeated the Mercians besieging Exeter, and forced their king, Penda of Mercia, into an alliance. Geoffrey also reports that Cadwallon married a half-sister of Penda.

Penda and Cadwallon together waged war against the Northumbrians. The Battle of Hatfield Chase on 12 October 633 ended in the defeat and death of Edwin and his son Osfrith. After this, the Kingdom of Northumbria fell into disarray, divided between its sub-kingdoms of Deira and Bernicia, but the war continued: according to the Anglo-Saxon Chronicle, "Cadwallon and Penda went and did for the whole land of Northumbria". Bede says that Cadwallon was besieged by the new king of Deira, Osric, "in a strong town"; Cadwallon, however, "sallied out on a sudden with all his forces, by surprise, and destroyed him [Osric] and all his army."

After this, according to Bede, Cadwallon ruled over the "provinces of the Northumbrians" for a year, "not like a victorious king, but like a rapacious and bloody tyrant." Furthermore, Bede tells us that Cadwallon, "though he bore the name and professed himself a Christian, was so barbarous in his disposition and behaviour, that he neither spared the female sex, nor the innocent age of children, but with savage cruelty put them to tormenting deaths, ravaging all their country for a long time, and resolving to cut off all the race of the English within the borders of Britain." According to John T. Koch, Bede's extremely negative portrayal of Cadwallon as a genocidal tyrant should not be taken at face value. Cadwallon's alliance with the Anglo-Saxon Penda undermines Bede's assertion that Cadwallon had attempted to exterminate the English. Additionally, the fact that Cædwalla of Wessex a generation after Cadwallon's death bore a name derived directly from the British Cadwallon suggests that Cadwallon's reputation could not have been so poor among the Saxons of Wessex as it was in Northumbria.

The new king of Bernicia, Eanfrith, was also killed by Cadwallon when the former went to him in an attempt to negotiate peace. However, Cadwallon was defeated by an army under Eanfrith's brother, Oswald, at the Battle of Heavenfield, "though he had most numerous forces, which he boasted nothing could withstand". Cadwallon was killed at a place called "Denis's-brook".

== Poetry attributed to Cadwallon ==
Some englynion said to have been composed by Cadwallon himself are further evidence of the body of verse concerning the king that circulated in the Middle Ages. They are rubricated Katwallaw[n] vab Katvan av kant 'Cadwallon ap Cadfan sang them' in the manuscript in which they appear. They occur at the bottom of f. 38^{r} of Peniarth MS 21, below a copy of Brut y Brenhinedd, during a section running from 37^{v} to 39^{v} concerning Geoffrey of Monmouth's narrative of Cadwallon. At least half an inch has been cut off from the bottom of f. 38, leaving only seven lines of the poem mostly intact.

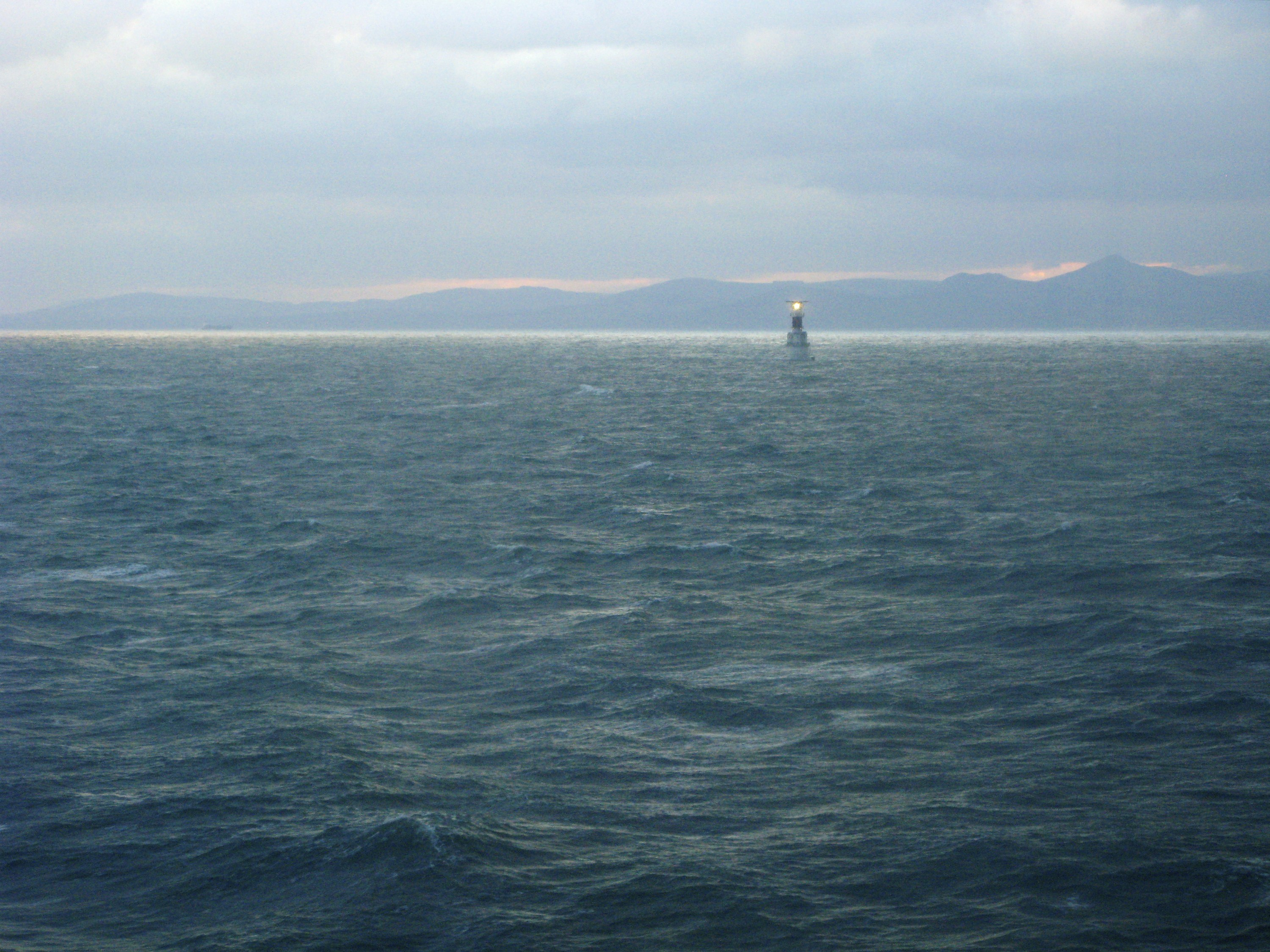
The blue-green waves near Dublin

Broad is the [ocean/ship]'s resolute protection, its long side […]
of the same colour of the blue-green wave before the city of Dublin
before the city of Dublin
Very bright are the bluish-green waves around me
Through fate the seeing of my enemy
my head is wet before […] waves
The ocean is my license, woe is me, God…

— Englynion attributed to Cadwallon ap Cadfan, translated by G. C. G. Thomas. (Note: For the original text, see here: ⠀: Llydan y herchwyn dengyn y phleit h[ir] y h[…]; vn lyu tonn wyrddlas ger dinas dulyn; Ker dinas dulyn; Gorwynyon tonneu gwyrdlas ymk[y]lchyn; trwy dinged y welet vynngelyn; Neut gwlyp vym pen gan […] tonneu; Neut gweilgi vyn trwydet gwae vi duw…; —Englynion attributed to Cadwallon ap Cadfan, from Peniarth MS 21.)

The poem reflects the tradition in the Welsh Triads of Cadwallon as one of the "Three Frivolous (Amateur?) Bards". Cadwallon seems to have gone into exile in Ireland and gathered his forces there before launching his campaign against Edwin. Geoffrey of Monmouth recorded that Edwin employed a seer to intercept Cadwallon whenever he tried to land in Britain from his exile, and this may be the 'fate' causing Cadwallon to see his 'enemy' in the fifth line. It is not certain whether Geoffrey invented the story, however, and the verse may therefore be a fragment of a longer verse saga concerning Cadwallon, though it is also likely that the scribe was the author, inspired by the text above it on the same page.

== See also ==
- Family tree of Welsh monarchs

== Sources ==
- Bromwich, Rachel, ed. (2014). Trioedd Ynys Prydein: The Triads of the Island of Britain (4th ed.). Cardiff: University of Wales Press. ISBN 9781783161454.
- Koch, John T. (2006). Celtic Culture: A Historical Encyclopedia. ABC-CLIO.
- Alex Woolf, "Caedualla Rex Brittonum and the Passing of the Old North", in Northern History, Vol. 41, Issue 1, March 2004, pages 5–24.
- Thomas, Graham C. G. (1970). "Dryll o Hen Lyfr Ysgrifen". Bulletin of the Board of Celtic Studies (in Welsh). 23. University of Wales Press: 309–16.
  —— (1976). "Llinellau o Gerddi i Gadwallon ap Cadfan". Bulletin of the Board of Celtic Studies (in Welsh). 26. University of Wales Press: 406–10.
- Thomas, Graham C. G. (1987). "A verse attributed to Cadwallon fab Cadfan". Bulletin of the Board of Celtic Studies (in Welsh). 34. University of Wales Press: 67–70.
- Wright, Neil (1985). Historia Regum Britannie of Geoffrey of Monmouth I: Bern, Burgerbibliothek, MS 568 (in Latin). Cambridge: D. S. Brewer. ISBN 9780859912112.

Regnal titles
Preceded by Cadfan ap Iago	Kings of Gwynedd c. 625 – 634	Succeeded by Cadafael
Legendary titles
Preceded by Cadfan ap Iago	King of Britain	Succeeded by Cadwaladr
