= Rowley Burn (Northumberland) =

Stream in Northumberland, England

Coordinates: 54°55′22″N 2°05′04″W

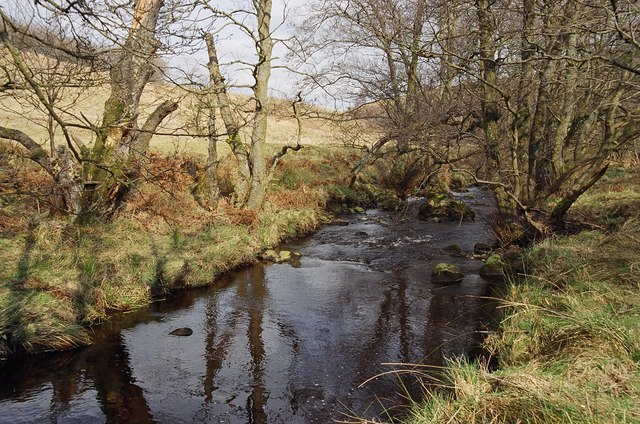
Rowley Burn

Rowley Burn (also known as Rowley Brook and Ham Burn, NY 9358) is a stream in Northumberland, running around three miles south of Hexham before joining the Devil's Water, which flows into the River Tyne.

== Etymology ==
Allen Mawer's Place-Names of Northumberland and Durham implies that the name of the stream may have the same etymology as places called Roughley, from Old English rūh (rough') and lēah ('open land in woodland').

== Geology ==
The formation of the Rowley Burn valley has been discussed by J. B. Sissons.

== History ==
Bede's Historia ecclesiastica gentis Anglorum, completed around 731, recounts a story of the Battle of Heavenfield, which Bede says took place 'in loco, qui lingua Anglorum Denisesburna, id est Riuus Denisi, uocatur' ('in a place which in the language of the English is called Denisesburna, that is the stream of Denisus' around 634. William Greenwell found evidence in a charter issued for the Archbishop of York by Thomas de Whittington in 1233 that Denisesburna was identical with Rowley Burn, and the identification has been accepted since. Despite Bede's interpretation of the Old English word Denisesburna as meaning 'Denisus's stream', more recent scholarship has judged that the first element more likely comes from the Brittonic languages.
