= Acha of Deira =

Anglo-Saxon princess

- Princess of Deira
- Born: c. 500s AD
- Died: c. 600s AD
- Husband: Æthelfrith
- Issue: Eanfrith; Oswald; Oswiu; Oswudu; Oslac; Oslaf; Offa; Æbba
- Father: Ælla of Deira

Acha of Deira was a princess of Deira, and the daughter of Ælla of Deira. Her brother was Edwin of Northumbria, and her grandfather was Yffe but apart from him, her earlier origin is unknown.

== Biography ==
Acha married Æthelfrith, king of Bernicia. He may have married her prior to taking power in Deira, in which case the marriage may have facilitated it, or he may have done so afterwards in order to consolidate his position there.

They had eight children:

- Eanfrith of Bernicia (590–634 AD)
- Oswald of Northumbria (c. 604–5 August 642 AD)
- Oswiu of Northumbria (c. 612–15 February 670 AD)
- Oswudu of Northumbria
- Oslac of Northumbria
- Oslaf of Northumbria
- Offa of Northumbria
- Æbba of Northumbria
