= Æthelric of Deira =

Æthelric

King of Deira
- Reign: c. 588–604
- Successor: Æthelfrith

Æthelric (died c. 604?) was supposedly a King of Deira (c. 589/599–c. 604). He is thought to have succeeded Ælla of Deira, but his existence is historically obscure.

Manuscript A of the Anglo-Saxon Chronicle reports that Ælle, king of Deira, was succeeded by Æthelric in 588, who reigned for five years. According to Bede, Deira was invaded and taken over by Æthelfrith of Bernicia in about the year 604. The circumstances of this are unclear, and Æthelric's fate is unknown. The fact that Edwin, a son of Ælla and possibly Æthelric's brother, had to flee into exile suggests that Deira may have been conquered by Æthelfrith, and in this case Æthelric may have been killed during warfare. Æthelfrith ruled both Deira and Bernicia, the two components of Northumbria, until he was killed in battle and the Deiran line was restored for a time under Edwin.

| Preceded by Ælla | King of Deira; 589–604 | Succeeded by Æthelfrith of Northumbria |
