= Oswald of Northumbria =

King of Northumbria from 634 to 641/42; Christian saint

Oswald
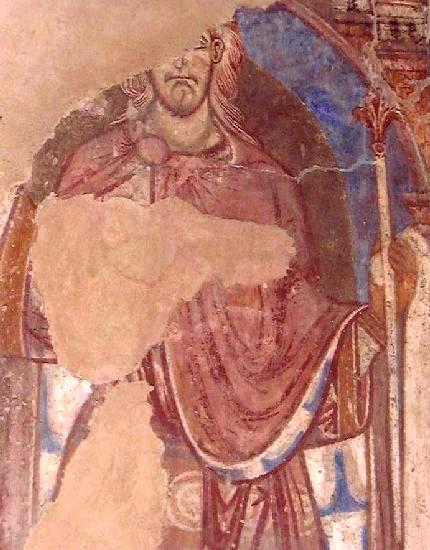
- A 12th-century painting of St Oswald in Durham Cathedral

Bretwalda
- Reign: 633–642
- Predecessor: Edwin of Northumbria
- Successor: Oswiu

King of Deira
- Reign: 633–642
- Predecessor: Osric of Deira
- Successor: Oswiu

King of Bernicia
- Reign: 634–642
- Predecessor: Eanfrith of Bernicia
- Successor: Oswiu
- Born: c. 604
- Died: 5 August 641/642 (aged 37–38)
- Spouse: Kyneburga of Wessex
- Issue: Œthelwald of Deira
- Father: Ethelfrith
- Mother: Acha of Deira
- Religion: Christianity

Oswald (Old English pronunciation: [ˈoːzwɑɫd]; c. 604 – 5 August 641/642) was King of Northumbria from 634 until his death, and is venerated as a saint, of whom there was a particular cult in the Middle Ages.

Oswald was the son of Æthelfrith of Bernicia and Acha of Deira and came to rule after spending a period in exile. After defeating the Welsh Gwyneddian ruler, Cadwallon ap Cadfan, at the Battle of Heavenfield, Oswald brought the two Northumbrian kingdoms of Bernicia and Deira once again under a single ruler and promoted the spread of Christianity in Northumbria. He was given a strongly positive assessment by the historian Bede, writing a little less than a century after Oswald's death, who regarded Oswald as a saintly king; it is also Bede who is the main source for present-day historical knowledge of Oswald. After eight years of rule, in which he was the most powerful ruler in Britain, Oswald was killed in the Battle of Maserfield while fighting the forces of Penda of Mercia, who then himself was defeated by Oswald's brother Oswiu.

== Background, youth and exile ==
Oswald's father, Æthelfrith, was a successful Bernician ruler who, after some years in power in Bernicia, also became king of Deira and thus was the first to rule both of the kingdoms that would come to be considered the constituent kingdoms of Northumbria. It would, however, be anachronistic to refer to a Northumbrian people or identity at this early stage, when the Bernicians and the Deirans were still clearly distinct peoples. Oswald's mother, Acha of Deira, was a member of the Deiran royal line, whom Æthelfrith apparently married as part of his acquisition of Deira or consolidation of power there. Oswald was apparently born in or around the year 604, since Bede says that he was killed at the age of 38 in 642; Æthelfrith's acquisition of Deira is also believed to have occurred around 604.

Æthelfrith, who was for years a successful war-leader, especially against the native British, was eventually killed in the battle of the River Idle around 616 by Raedwald of East Anglia. This defeat meant that an exiled member of the Deiran royal line, Edwin (Acha's brother), became king of Northumbria and Oswald and his brothers fled to the north. Oswald thus spent the remainder of his youth in the Scottish kingdom of Dál Riata in northern Britain, where he was converted to Christianity. He may also have fought in Ireland during this period of exile. It has been considered that Oswald is one of the three Saxon princes mentioned in the Irish poem Togail Bruidne Dá Derga, being named as 'Osalt' in that work.

== Victory over Cadwallon ==
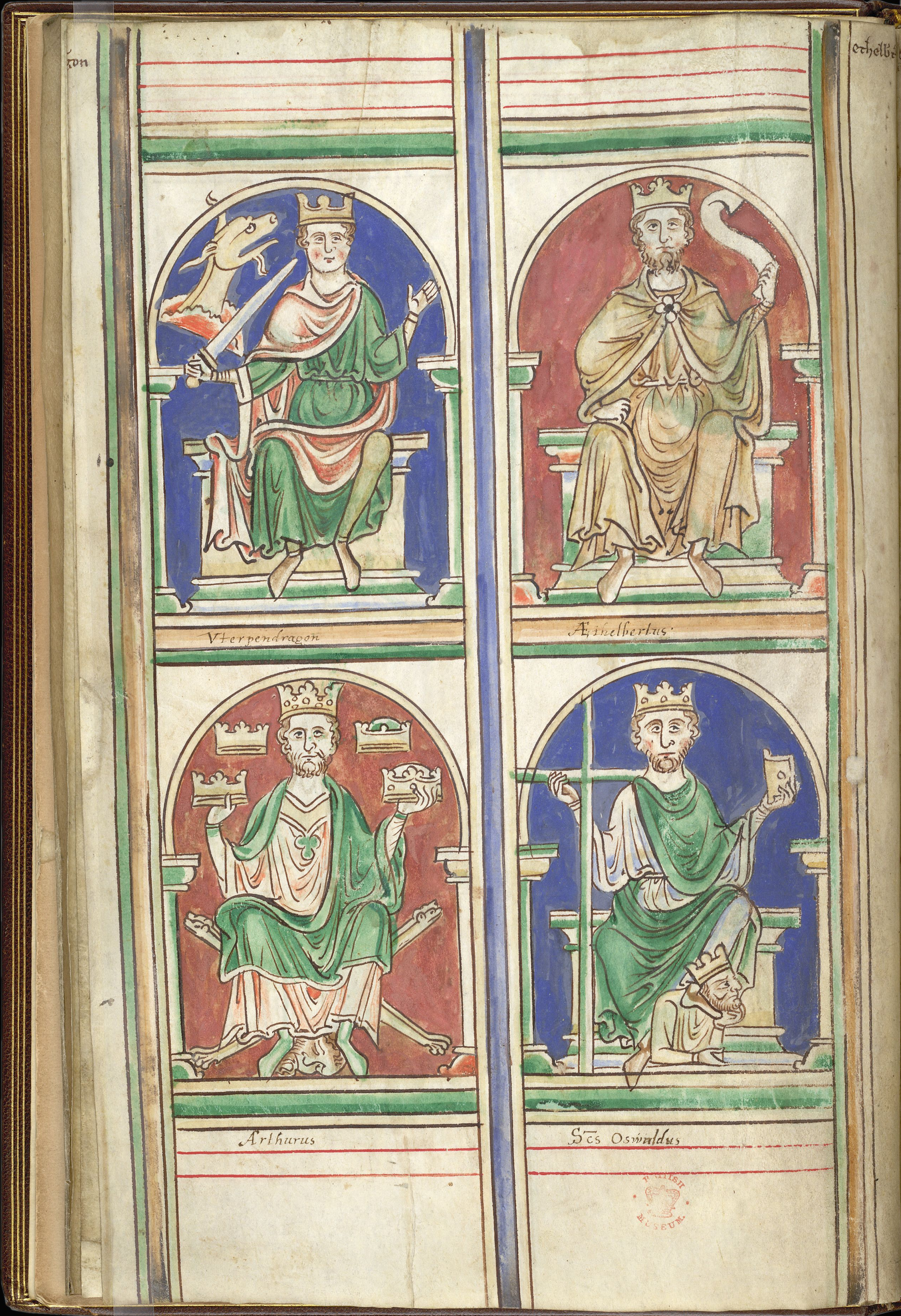
Portrait of Oswald (lower right), Epitome of Chronicles, Matthew Paris, early 13th century

After Cadwallon ap Cadfan, the king of Gwynedd, in alliance with the pagan Penda of Mercia, killed Edwin of Deira in battle at Hatfield Chase in 633 (or 632, depending on when the years used by Bede are considered to have begun), Northumbria was split into its constituent kingdoms of Bernicia and Deira. Oswald's brother Eanfrith became king of Bernicia but was killed by Cadwallon in 634 (or 633) after attempting to negotiate peace. Subsequently Oswald, at the head of a small army (possibly with the aid of allies from the north, the Scots or the Picts), met Cadwallon in battle at Heavenfield, near Hexham. Before the battle, tradition says Oswald had a wooden cross erected; he knelt down, holding the cross in position until enough earth had been thrown in the hole to make it stand firm. He then prayed and asked his army to join in.

Adomnán in his Life of Saint Columba offers a longer account, which Abbot Ségéne had heard from Oswald himself. Oswald, he says, had a vision of Columba the night before the battle, in which he was told

Be strong and act manfully. Behold, I will be with thee. This coming night go out from your camp into battle, for the Lord has granted me that at this time your foes shall be put to flight and Cadwallon your enemy shall be delivered into your hands and you shall return victorious after battle and reign happily.

Oswald described his vision to his council and all agreed that they would be baptised and accept Christianity after the battle. In the battle that followed, the Welsh (Britons) were routed despite their superior numbers; Cadwallon himself was killed.

== Overlordship ==
A map showing the general locations of the Anglo-Saxon peoples around the year 600

Following the victory at Heavenfield, Oswald reunited Northumbria and re-established the Bernician supremacy, which had been interrupted by Edwin. Bede says that Oswald held imperium for the eight years of his rule (both Bede and the Anglo-Saxon Chronicle say that Oswald's reign was actually considered to be nine years, the ninth year being accounted for by assigning to Oswald the year preceding his rule, "on account of the heathenism practised by those who had ruled that one year between him and Edwin"), and was the most powerful king in Britain. In the 9th-century Anglo-Saxon Chronicle he is referred to as a Bretwalda. Adomnán describes Oswald as "ordained by God as Emperor of all Britain".

Oswald seems to have been widely recognized as overlord, although the extent of his authority is uncertain. Bede makes the claim that Oswald "brought under his dominion all the nations and provinces of Britain", which, as Bede notes, was divided by language among the English, Britons, Scots and Picts; however he seems to undermine his own claim when he mentions at another point in his history that it was Oswald's brother Oswiu who made tributary the Picts and Scots. An Irish source, the Annals of Tigernach, records that the Anglo-Saxons banded together against Oswald early in his reign; this may indicate an attempt to put an end to Oswald's overlordship south of the Humber, which presumably failed.

The Mercians, who participated in Edwin's defeat in 633, seem to have presented an obstacle to Oswald's authority south of the Humber, although it has been generally thought that Oswald dominated Mercia to some degree after Heavenfield. It may have been to appease Oswald that Penda had Eadfrith, a captured son of Edwin (and thus a dynastic rival of Oswald), killed, although it is also possible that Penda had his own motives for the killing.

Oswald apparently controlled the Kingdom of Lindsey, given the evidence of a story told by Bede regarding the moving of Oswald's bones to a monastery there; Bede says that the monks rejected the bones initially because Oswald had ruled over them as a foreign king. To the north, it may have been Oswald who conquered the Gododdin. Irish annals record the siege of Edinburgh, thought to have been the royal stronghold of the Gododdin, in 638, and this seems to mark the end of the kingdom; that this siege was undertaken by Oswald is suggested by the apparent control of the area by his brother Oswiu in the 650s.

Oswald seems to have been on good terms with the West Saxons: he stood as sponsor to the baptism of their king, Cynegils, and married Cynegils' daughter. Her name is reported by only one source, Reginald of Durham's 12th century Vita S. Oswaldi, which says that it was Kyneburga. Although Oswald had one known son, Æthelwald, it is uncertain whether this was a son from his marriage to Cynegils' daughter or from an earlier relationship—since Æthelwald began ruling in Deira in 651, it has been argued that a son from this marriage would have been too young at the time to be trusted with this position, and therefore may have been older, the product of a relationship Oswald had during his exile.

== Christianity ==
Although Edwin had previously converted to Christianity in 627, it was Oswald who did the most to spread the religion in Northumbria. Shortly after becoming king he asked the Irish of Dál Riata to send a bishop to facilitate the conversion of his people. The Irish at first sent an "austere" bishop, who was unsuccessful in his mission, and subsequently sent Aidan, who proposed a gentler approach. Oswald gave the island of Lindisfarne to Aidan as his episcopal see. Aidan achieved great success in spreading the Christian faith. Bede mentions that Oswald acted as Aidan's interpreter when the latter was preaching, since Aidan did not know English well and Oswald had learned Irish during his exile.

Although Oswald could be interpreted as a martyr for his death in battle, Bede puts a clear emphasis on Oswald being saintly as a king. Bede does not focus on his martyrdom as being primary to his sainthood: indeed it has been noted that Bede never uses the word 'martyr' in reference to Oswald. Bede's portrayal of Oswald stands out as unusual as a king regarded as saintly for his life while ruling, in contrast to a king who gives up the kingship in favour of religious life or who is venerated because of the manner of his death. Bede recounts Oswald's generosity to the poor and to strangers and tells a story highlighting this characteristic: on one occasion, at Easter, Oswald was sitting at dinner with Aidan and had "a silver dish full of dainties before him", when a servant, whom Oswald "had appointed to relieve the poor", came in and told Oswald that a crowd of the poor were in the streets begging alms from the king. According to Bede Oswald immediately had his food given to the poor and even had the dish broken up and distributed. Aidan was greatly impressed and seized Oswald's right hand, stating: "May this hand never perish." Accordingly, Bede reports that the hand and arm remained uncorrupted after Oswald's death.

== Downfall ==
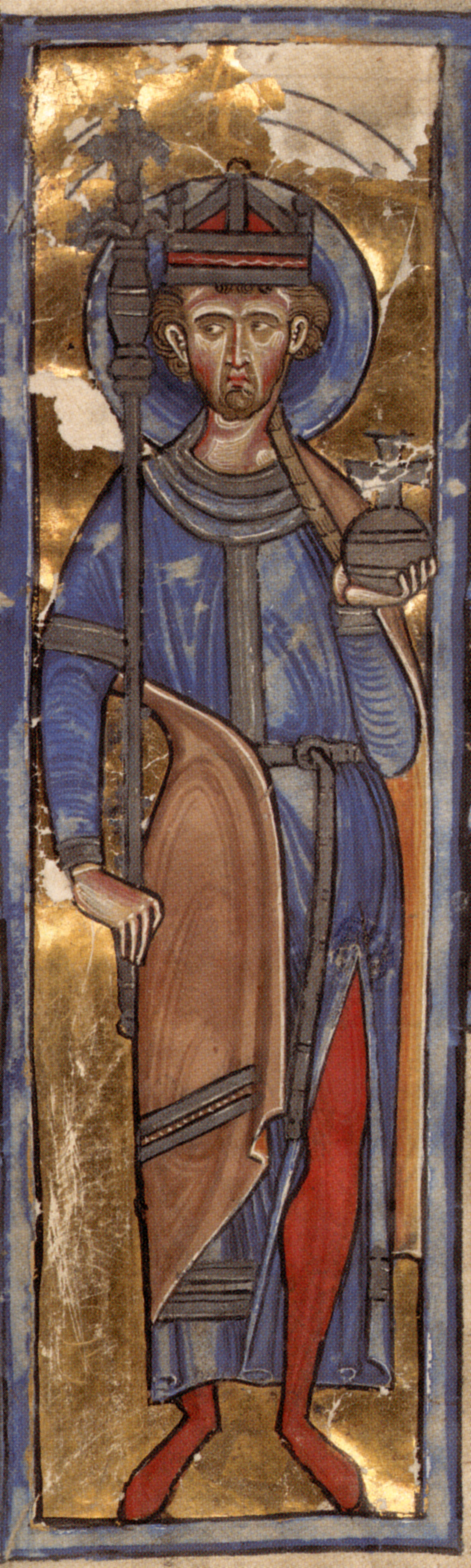
Oswald crowned as a king from a 13th-century manuscript

It was a conflict with the pagan Mercians under Penda that proved to be Oswald's undoing. He was killed in 642, by the Mercians at the Battle of Maserfield, in Oswestry (although other candidates for the location of the battle have been suggested) and his body was dismembered. Bede mentions the story that Oswald "ended his life in prayer": he prayed for the souls of his soldiers when he saw that he was about to die. Oswald's head and limbs were placed on stakes.

The traditional identification of the battle site with Oswestry, probably in the territory of Powys at the time, suggests that Penda may have had British allies in this battle, and this is also suggested by surviving Welsh poetry which has been thought to indicate the participation of the men of Powys in the battle. It has also been considered that, if the traditional identification of the site as Oswestry is correct, Oswald was on the offensive, in the territory of his enemies. This could conflict with Bede's saintly portrayal of Oswald, since an aggressive war could hardly qualify as a just war, perhaps explaining why Bede is silent on the cause of the war, he says only that Oswald died "fighting for his fatherland", as well as his failure to mention other offensive warfare Oswald is presumed to have engaged in between Heavenfield and Maserfield. Oswald may have had an ally in Penda's brother Eowa, who was also killed in the battle, according to the Historia Britonnum and Annales Cambriae; while the source only mentions that Eowa was killed, not the side on which he fought, it has been speculated that Eowa was subject to Oswald and fighting alongside him in the battle, in opposition to Penda.

== Veneration and legacy ==
Saint Oswald of Northumbria

Martyr
- Born: c. 604; Deira, Northumbria
- Died: 5 August 641/642
- Venerated in: The Roman Catholic Church, The Anglican Communion, Eastern Orthodoxy
- Canonized: Pre-Congregation
- Major shrine: Bardney Abbey, Lincolnshire, England; relics later translated to St Oswald's Priory, Gloucester, England
- Feast: 5 August
- Attributes: king in crown, carrying sceptre and orb, ciborium, sword, palm-branch or with his raven

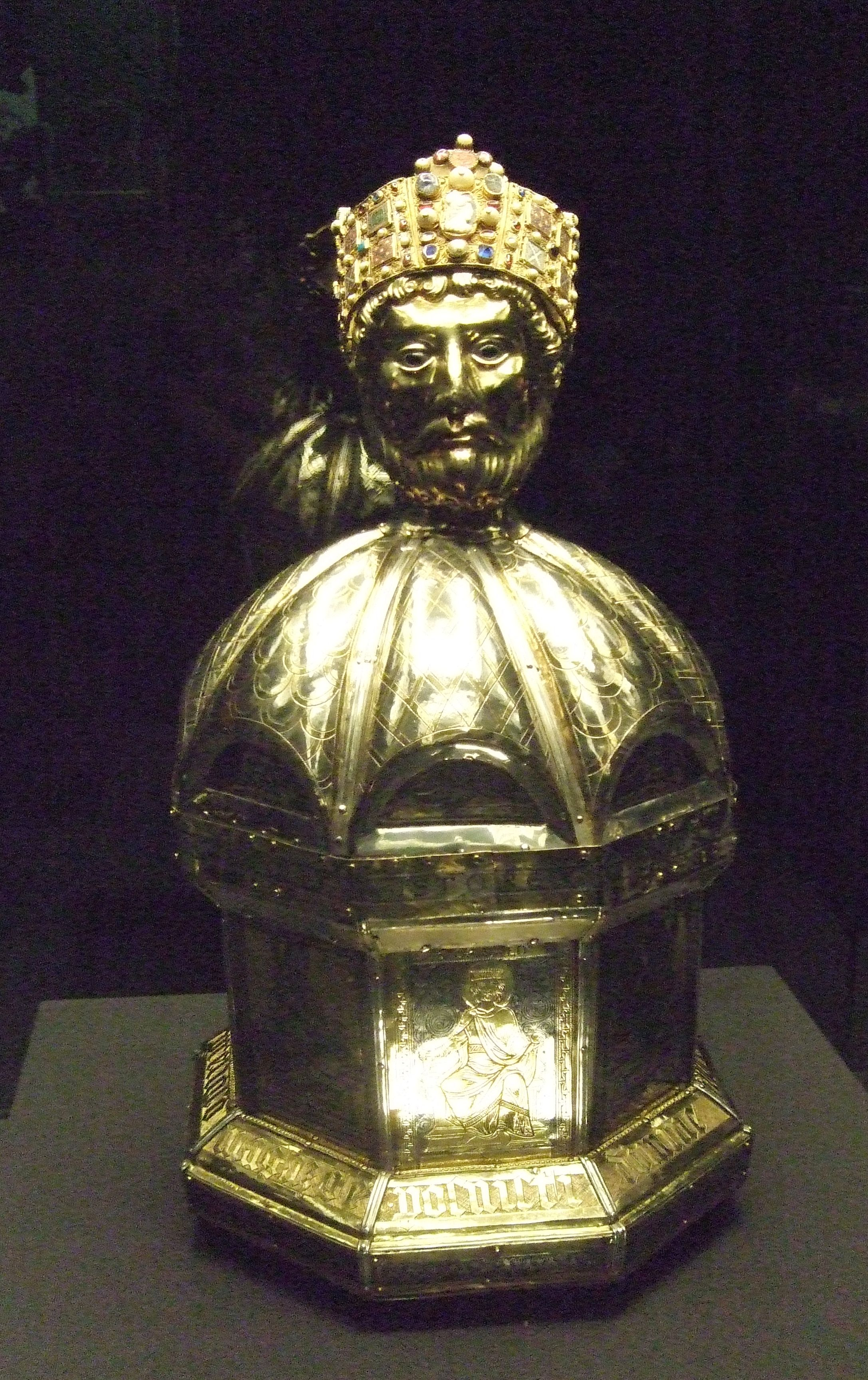
St Oswald relic receptacle, Hildesheim, 12th century

Oswald soon came to be regarded as a saint. Bede says that the spot where he died came to be associated with miracles, and people took dirt from the site, which led to a hole being dug as deep as a man's height. Reginald of Durham recounts another miracle, saying that his right arm was taken by a bird (perhaps a raven) to an ash tree, which gave the tree ageless vigour; when the bird dropped the arm onto the ground, a spring emerged from the ground. Both the tree and the spring were, according to Reginald, subsequently associated with healing miracles. Aspects of the legend have been considered to have pagan overtones or influences—this may represent a fusion of his status as a traditional Germanic warrior-king with Christianity. The name of the site, Oswestry, or "Oswald's Tree", is generally thought to be derived from Oswald's death there and the legends surrounding it. His feast day is 5 August. The cult surrounding him even gained prominence in parts of continental Europe; cf. Ožbalt in Slovenia.

Bede mentions that Oswald's brother Oswiu, who succeeded Oswald in Bernicia, retrieved Oswald's remains in the year after his death. In writing of one miracle associated with Oswald, Bede gives some indication of how Oswald was regarded in conquered lands: years later, when his niece Osthryth moved his bones to Bardney Abbey in Lindsey, its inmates initially refused to accept them, "though they knew him to be a holy man", because "he was originally of another province, and had reigned over them as a foreign king", and thus "they retained their ancient aversion to him, even after death". It was only after Oswald's bones were the focus of what was said to be a miracle, in which, during the night, a pillar of light appeared over the wagon in which the bones were being carried and shone up into the sky, that they were accepted into the monastery: "in the morning, the brethren who had refused it the day before, began themselves earnestly to pray that those holy relics, so beloved by God, might be deposited among them".

In the early 10th century, Bardney was in Viking territory, and in 909, following a combined West Saxon and Mercian raid led by Æthelflæd, daughter of Alfred the Great, St Oswald's relics were translated to a new minster in Gloucester, which was renamed St Oswald's Priory in his honour. Æthelflæd, and her husband Æthelred, ealdorman of Mercia, were buried in the priory, and their nephew, King Æthelstan, was a major patron of Oswald's cult.

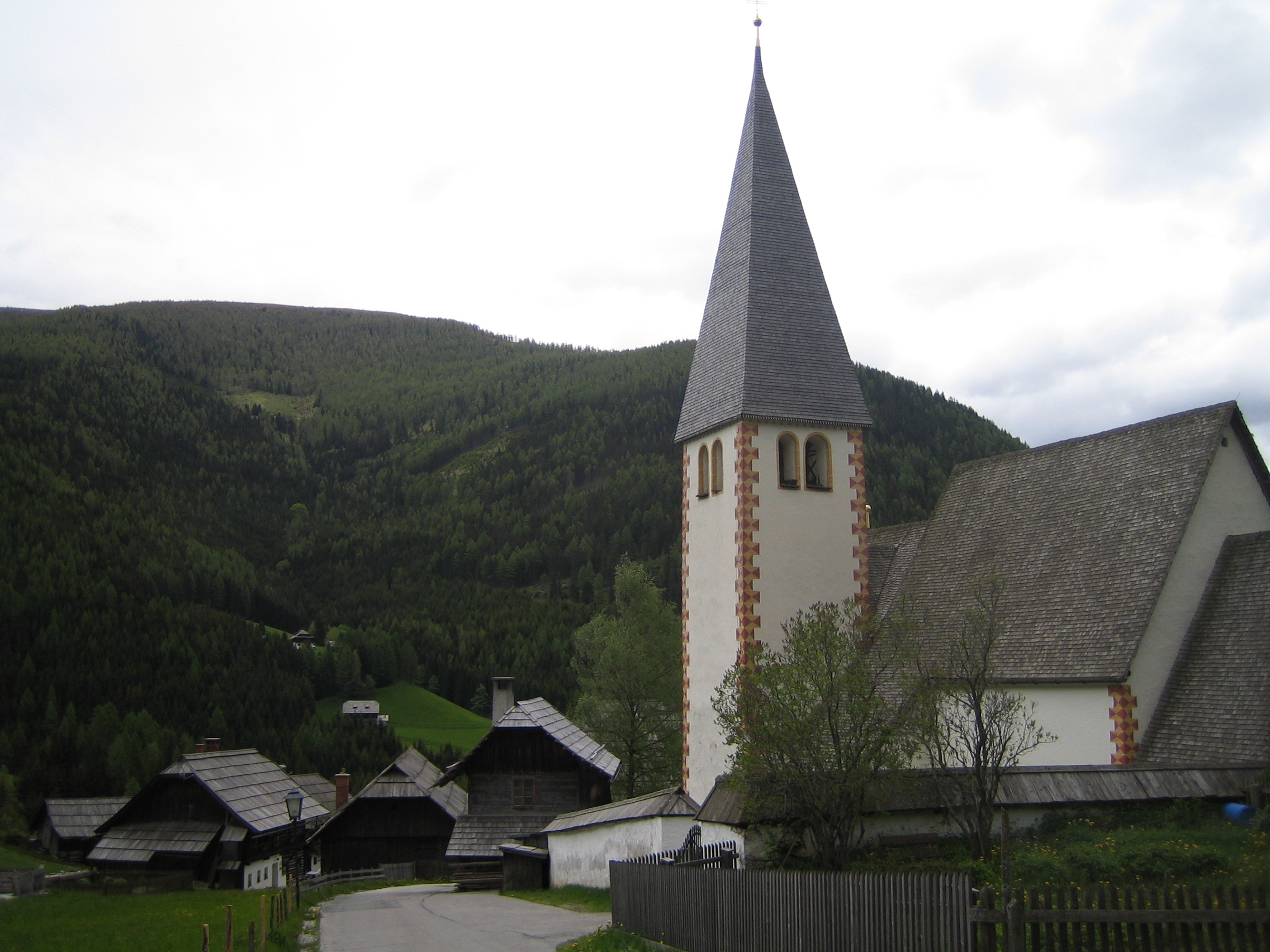
Saint Oswald's church, Bad Kleinkirchheim, Carinthia, one of many churches and place names which commemorate Oswald

Oswald's head was interred in Durham Cathedral together with the remains of Cuthbert of Lindisfarne (a saint with whom Oswald became posthumously associated, although the two were not associated in life; Cuthbert became bishop of Lindisfarne more than forty years after Oswald's death) and other valuables in a quickly made coffin, where it is generally believed to remain, although there are at least four other claimed heads of Oswald in continental Europe. One of his arms is said to have ended up in Peterborough Abbey later in the Middle Ages. The story is that a small group of monks from Peterborough made their way to Bamburgh where Oswald's uncorrupted arm was kept and stole it under the cover of darkness. They returned with it to Peterborough and in due time a chapel was created for the arm, Oswald's Chapel. Minus the arm, this can be seen to this day in the south transept of the cathedral. When creating this chapel the monks of Peterborough had thought of how they had acquired it and built into the chapel a narrow tower—just big enough for a monk to climb to the top by an internal stair and stand guard over Oswald's arm 24 hours a day, every day of the year. The monk had to stand because the tower is not large enough for him to sit, sitting could lull him to sleep, and they knew what could happen when no-one was watching.

Several churches bear the name of St Oswald, including The Church of Saint Oswald on the location of the wooden cross left by Oswald at Heavenfield, the night before the battle. This was rebuilt in 1717. The site is visible from the B6318 Military Road. St Oswald's Grasmere is purportedly on one of the sites he preached on, on a bank of the River Rothay. William Wordsworth's grave is located in the cemetery here. St Oswald's Church, Compton Abdale in Gloucestershire was dedicated to St Oswald following Æthelflæd's foundation of St Oswald's Priory in 909. St Oswald's Catholic Church lies to the north of Peterborough City Centre.

Some English place names record his reign, for example it has been claimed that Oswaldtwistle in Lancashire, meaning the twistle of Oswald, is linked to the saint, although it is more likely to be the name of the owner of the land. Kirkoswald in Cumbria is so named because it is believed that his body was taken there after his death. The local church is ascribed to him. Another Kirkoswald in Scotland also commemorates him.

Oswald is remembered in the Church of England with a Lesser Festival on 5 August.

Oswald is believed to have earned the nickname Lamnguin (White Blade), latinised as Lamnguinus, which has led scholars to posit that he is the legendary king Languines appearing in the chivalric romance Amadís de Gaula, where he is mentioned as Languines of Scotland (conflated with Northumbria in the Iberian romance), where he appears as a heroic king and a father-like figure for the young protagonist.

== Notes ==
Oswald of Northumbria Born: c. 604 Died: 642
Regnal titles
Preceded by Eanfrith	King of Bernicia; 634–642	Succeeded by Oswiu
Preceded by Osric	King of Deira; 633–642	Succeeded by Oswiu
