= Ælla of Deira =

King of Deira from around 560 until 588

Ælla

King of Deira
- Reign: c. 560–588
- Successor: Æthelric
- Died: 588
- Issue: Edwin; Acha
- Father: Yffe

Ælla or Ælle is the first known king of the Anglian kingdom of Deira, which he ruled from around 560 until his death in 588.

== Biography ==
The Anglo-Saxon Chronicle records that Ælla became king in 560. Anachronistically, the name of his kingdom is given as Northumbria, but the region was actually split between Deira and Bernicia at the time. Ælla's kingdom is identified by Bede as Deira – the use of Northumbria could be based on a tradition whereby the most powerful Anglian king in the region would claim that title. Ælla was almost certainly a pagan – when Pope Gregory the Great encountered two pale-skinned English boys (Deirans) at a slave market in Rome he is said to have remarked that they were "not Angles, but angels, if they were Christian". (Non Angli, sed angeli, si forent Christiani.) and upon learning that the king of Deira was Ælla he said "Alleluia should be sung in that land".

There is some confusion regarding the time and manner of Ælla's death. The Chronicle reports for 588 that "This year died Ælla; and then Æthelric succeeded to the kingdom of the Northumbrians", although a later source expands and says that he was killed by Æthelfrith, son of Æthelric, the former king of Bernicia. This account is contradicted by Bede, who says that Ælla was still king in 597 when Augustine of Canterbury came to Britain. In either case, after Ælla's death his family were forced to flee as the rulers of Bernicia seized control of the kingdom.

== Family ==
The Chronicle gives Ælla's father as Yffe, and gives a genealogy going back to Woden. Two children of Ælla are identifiable from historical records - Edwin and Acha. Edwin went into exile upon his father's death but eventually became king of both Deira and Bernicia. Acha similarly went into exile, and she eventually married Æthelfrith of Bernicia. Ælla had at least one brother, Ælfric, and his successor as king, Æthelric, is variously identified as another brother or a son.

Preceded by None	King of Deira c. 560–unknown	Succeeded by Aethelric
