= Devil's Water =

River in Northumberland, England

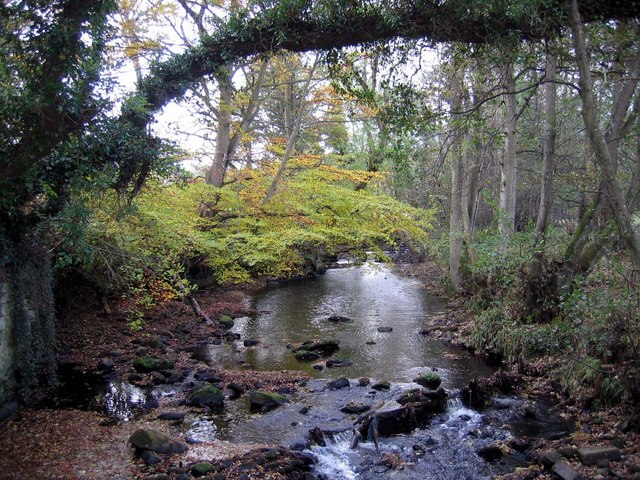
- Devil's Water

- Location within Northumberland

Location
- Country: United Kingdom
- County: Northumberland

Physical characteristics
- Mouth
  - coordinates: 54.9746°N 2.0395°W
- Length: 26.3 km (16.3 mi)

Devil's Water is a narrow, powerful river in Northumberland, England. It rises in the moors of Hexhamshire and empties into the Tyne between the towns of Hexham and Corbridge. Its tributaries include the Rowley Burn and West Dipton Burn.

The Battle of Hexham was fought on the banks of Devil's Water in 1464.

== Etymology ==
Devil's Water is one of a number of rivers that take their names from a Brittonic compound meaning "black stream". Other examples are the Douglas, the Dawlish, and the Dulais. In the case of Devil's Water, the name has been corrupted by the influence of the English word "devil" (cf. Devil's Brook in Dorset). The river gives its name to the hamlet of Dilston, which was originally known as Develeston.
