= Osric of Deira =

7th century King of Deira

Osric (died 633 or 634) was a King of Deira (632–633 or 633–634) in northern England. He was a cousin of king Edwin of Northumbria, being the son of Edwin's uncle Æthelric of Deira. Osric was also the father of Oswine.

After Edwin was killed in battle against Cadwallon ap Cadfan of Gwynedd and Penda of Mercia, Northumbria fell into disarray, with Eanfrith taking power in the sub-kingdom of Bernicia and Osric taking power in Deira. According to Bede, Osric was, like Eanfrith, a Christian who reverted to paganism upon coming to power.

Cadwallon continued his ruinous invasion of Northumbria, however. Bede says that Osric besieged Cadwallon "in a strong town", but Cadwallon successfully "sallied out on a sudden with all his forces, by surprise, and destroyed him [Osric] and all his army."

The year in which he and Eanfrith ruled was subsequently deemed so abhorrent because of their paganism that it was decided to add that year to the reign of the Christian Oswald of Bernicia, who defeated Cadwallon and came to rule both Bernicia and Deira, so as to ignore the brief reigns of Osric and Eanfrith.

Preceded by Edwin	King of Deira	Succeeded by Oswald
