= Edwin of Northumbria =

King of Deira and Bernicia from 616 to 632/633

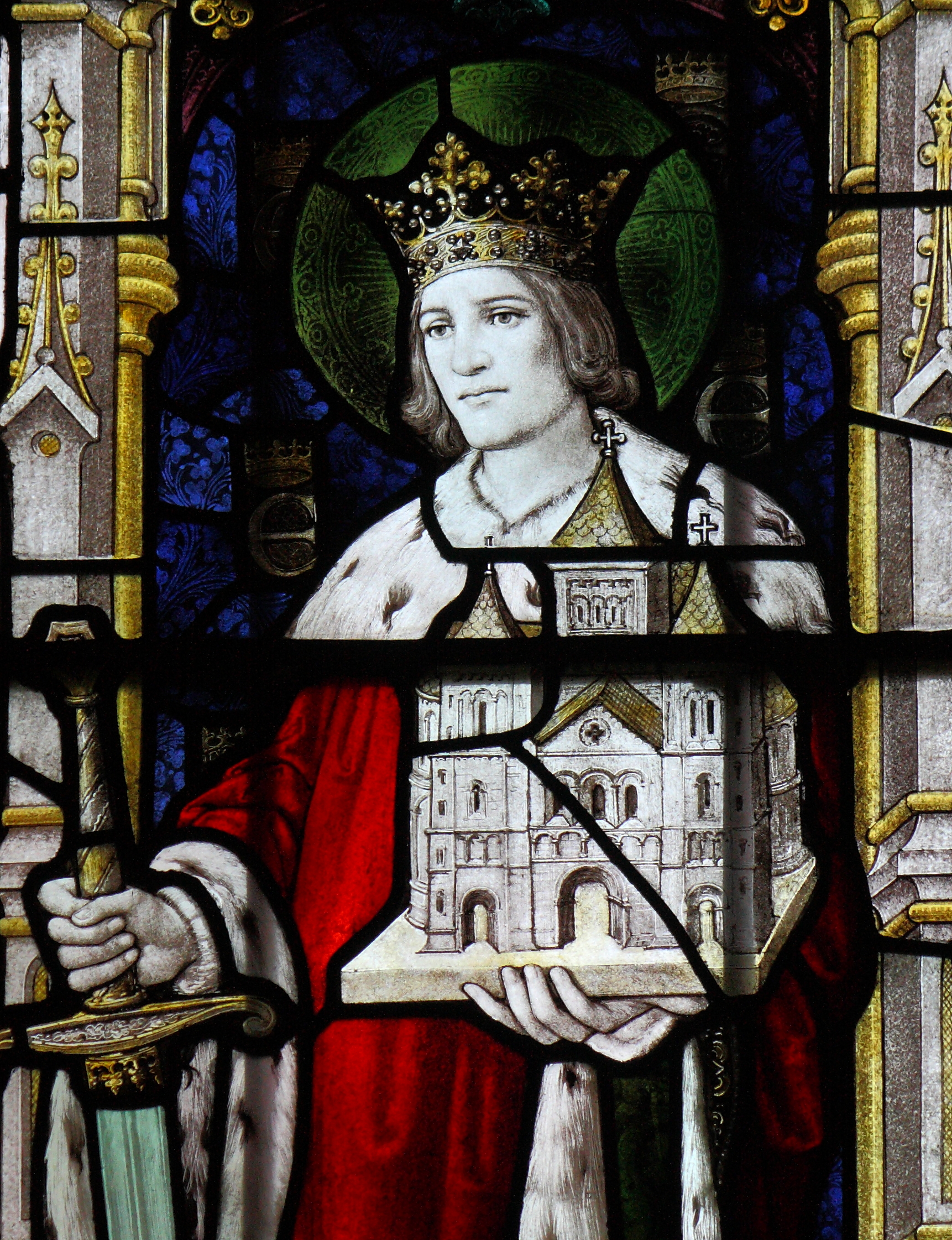
- Stained glass image of St. Edwin of Northumbria at St Mary, Sledmere, Yorkshire.

King of Deira and Bernicia
- Reign: 616 – 12 October 632/633
- Predecessor: Æthelfrith
- Born: c. 586; Deira, England
- Died: 12 October 633 (aged 46–47); Hatfield Chase, England
- Spouse: Cwenburg; Æthelburg of Kent
- Issue: Osfrith, Uscfrea, Eadfrith, Æthelhun, Eanflæd, Æthelthryth
- Father: Ælle
- Religion: Christianity

Edwin (Old English: Ēadwine; c. 586 – 12 October 632/633), also known as Eadwine or Æduinus, was the King of Deira and Bernicia – which later became known as Northumbria – from around 616 until his death. He was the second monarch to rule both of these northern English kingdoms and the first to convert to Christianity. After he died in battle, he was venerated as a saint.

Edwin was the son of Ælle, the first known king of Deira, and likely had at least two siblings. His sister Acha was married to Æthelfrith, king of neighbouring Bernicia. Edwin was forced into exile when Æthelfrith conquered Deira. His travels took him to the court of Rædwald of East Anglia, who defeated Æthelfrith in 616, allowing Edwin to ascend the thrones of Bernicia and Deira. After the death of his patron Rædwald around 624, Edwin became the most powerful ruler in Britain. Bede the Venerable includes him in his list of kings who exercised imperium over other Anglo-Saxon monarchs, and the Anglo-Saxon Chronicle gives him the title bretwalda, or "ruler of Britain".

In 627, Edwin was baptised under the influence of his wife, Æthelburh of Kent, and the Roman missionary Paulinus, who became the first Bishop of York. After reigning for seventeen years, Edwin was defeated and killed in 633 at the Battle of Hatfield Chase by the combined armies of his supposed foster-brother Cadwallon ap Cadfan and the pagan Penda of Mercia. After his death, Bernicia and Deira were again separated under two pagan kings. Their reunification was accomplished by Oswald, a son of Æthelfrith, who defeated and killed Cadwallon and united Northumbria once more.

== Early life and exile ==
The Anglo-Saxon Chronicle reported that on Ælle's death a certain "Æthelric" assumed power. The exact identity of Æthelric is unclear. He may have been a brother of Ælle, an elder brother of Edwin, an otherwise unknown Deiran noble, or the father of Æthelfrith. Æthelfrith himself appears to have been king of "Northumbria"—both Deira and Bernicia—by no later than 604. An otherwise unknown sibling fathered Hereric, who in turn fathered Abbess Hilda of Whitby and Hereswith, wife to Æthelric, the brother of king Anna of East Anglia. During the reign of Æthelfrith, Edwin was an exile. The location of his early exile as a child is not known, but late traditions, reported by Reginald of Durham and Geoffrey of Monmouth, place Edwin in the kingdom of Gwynedd, fostered by king Cadfan ap Iago, so allowing biblical parallels to be drawn from the struggle between Edwin and his supposed foster-brother Cadwallon. By the 610s, he was certainly in Mercia under the protection of king Cearl, whose daughter, Cwenburg, he married.

By around 616, Edwin was in East Anglia under the protection of king Rædwald. Bede reports that Æthelfrith tried to have Rædwald murder his unwanted rival, and that Rædwald intended to do so until his wife persuaded him otherwise with Divine prompting. Æthelfrith faced Rædwald in the Battle of the River Idle in 616, and Æthelfrith was defeated; Rædwald installed Edwin as king of Northumbria. Rædwald's son Rægenhere may have been killed at this battle, but the exact date or manner of Rædwald's death are not known. He likely died between the years 616–627, and the efficacy of Edwin's kingship ostensibly depended greatly on his fealty to Rædwald.

Edwin was installed as king of Northumbria, effectively confirming Rædwald as bretwalda: Æthelfrith's sons went into exile in Gaelic kingdom of Dál Riata and Pictland. That Edwin was able to take power not only in his native Deira but also in Bernicia may have been due to his support from Rædwald, to whom he may have remained subject during the early part of his reign. Edwin's reign marks an interruption of the otherwise consistent domination of Northumbria by the Bernicians and has been seen as "contrary to the prevailing tendency".

== As king ==
The main Anglo-Saxon Kingdoms in Edwin's time.

With the death of Æthelfrith, and of the powerful Æthelberht of Kent the same year, Rædwald and his client Edwin were well placed to dominate England, and indeed Rædwald did so until his death a decade later. Edwin expelled Ceretic from the minor British kingdom of Elmet in either 616 or 626. Elmet had probably been subject to Mercia and then to Edwin.

Edwin and Eadbald of Kent were allies at this time, and Edwin arranged to marry Eadbald's sister Æthelburg. Bede notes that Eadbald would agree to marry his sister to Edwin only if he converted to Christianity. The marriage of Eadbald's Merovingian mother Bertha had resulted in the conversion of Kent and Æthelburg's would do the same in Northumbria.

Edwin's expansion to the west may have begun early in his reign. There is firm evidence of a war waged in the early 620s between Edwin and Fiachnae mac Báetáin of the Dál nAraidi, king of the Ulaid in Ireland. A lost poem is known to have existed recounting Fiachnae's campaigns against the Saxons, and the Irish annals report the siege, or the storming, of Bamburgh in Bernicia in 623–624. This should presumably be placed in the context of Edwin's designs on the Isle of Man, a target of Ulaid ambitions. Fiachnae's death in 626, at the hands of his namesake, Fiachnae mac Demmáin of the Dál Fiatach, and the second Fiachnae's death a year later in battle against the Dál Riata probably eased the way for Edwin's conquests in the Irish sea province.

The routine of kingship in Edwin's time involved regular, probably annual, wars with neighbours to obtain tribute, submission, and slaves. By Edwin's death, it is likely that these annual wars, unreported in the main, had extended the Northumbrian kingdoms from the Humber and the Mersey north to the Southern Uplands and the Cheviots.

The royal household moved regularly from one royal vill to the next, consuming the food renders given in tribute and the produce of the royal estates, dispensing justice, and ensuring that royal authority remained visible throughout the land. The royal sites in Edwin's time included Yeavering in Bernicia, where traces of a timber amphitheatre have been found. This "Roman" feature makes Bede's claim that Edwin was preceded by a standard-bearer carrying a "tufa" (OE thuuf, this may have been a winged globe) appear to be more than antiquarian curiosity, although whether the model for this practice was Roman or Frankish is unknown. Other royal sites included Campodunum in Elmet (perhaps Barwick), Sancton in Deira, and Goodmanham, the site where the pagan high priest Coifi destroyed the idols according to Bede. Edwin's realm included the former Roman cities of York and Carlisle, and both appear to have been of some importance in the 7th century, although it is not clear whether urban life continued in this period.

== Conversion to Christianity ==
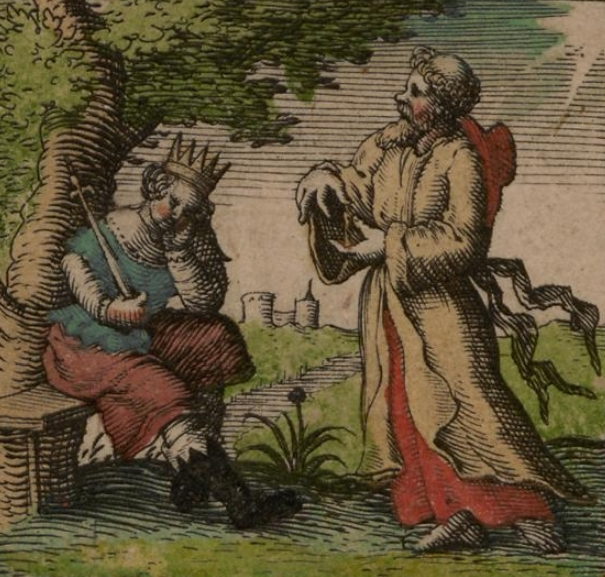
Depiction of Edwin from John Speed's 1611 "Saxon Heptarchy".

The account of Edwin's conversion offered by Bede turns on two events. The first, during Edwin's exile, tells how Edwin's life was saved by Paulinus of York. The second, following his marriage to Æthelburg, was the attempted assassination at York, at Easter 626, by an agent of Cwichelm of Wessex. Apart from these events, the general character of Bede's account is one of an indecisive king, unwilling to take risks, unable to decide whether to convert or not.

Along with these events, the influence of Edwin's half-Merovingian Queen cannot be ignored, and the letters which Bede reproduces, sent by Pope Boniface V to Edwin and Æthelburg, are unlikely to have been unique. Given that Kent was under Frankish influence, while Bede sees the mission as being "Roman" in origin, the Franks were equally interested in converting their fellow Germans and in extending their power and influence. Bede recounts Edwin's baptism, and that of his chief men, on 12 April 627. Edwin's zeal, so Bede says, led to Rædwald's son Eorpwald also converting.

Bede's account of the conversion is oft-cited. After Paulinus explains the tenets of Christianity, the king asks his counsellors what they think of the new doctrine. Edwin's priest Coifi responds that they may be worthwhile; after all, he says, no one has been more respectful of and devoted to their gods than he, and he has seen no benefits from his dedication to them. Then, an unnamed counsellor stands up and addresses the king, also seeing the benefit of the new faith. Coifi speaks again and announces that they should destroy the idols and temples they had hitherto worshipped. King Edwin agrees and embraces Christianity; Coifi himself will set fire to the idols, declaring "I will do this myself, for now that the true God has granted me knowledge, who more suitably than I can set a public example, and destroy the idols that I worshipped in ignorance?" Bede goes on to describe the scene as Coifi "formally renounces his superstitions, and asked the king to give him arms and a stallion." Armed with both a sword and spear, Coifi rides Edwin's horse towards the idols, all within view of the crowd gathered to witness Edwin's conversion. Upon reaching the temple, Coifi "cast a spear into it and profaned it."

In an article titled "How Coifi Pierced Christ's Side", Julia Barrow examines Bede's Latinate text and pays particular attention to the passage concerning Coifi's attack upon the temple. Barrow notes that Bede's use of lancea was "not the word medieval writers normally used for spear", while "hasta was the usual choice." Barrow goes on to claim that lancea was likely used by Bede as a reference to the details of the crucifixion of Christ provided in the vulgate book of John, thus Coifi's desecration of the shrine is to be understood "as an inversion of the piercing of the temple of Christ's body." All of these details support an understanding that Bede had great "warmth and admiration" for Edwin.

The brief speech by the unnamed counsellor, a nobleman, has attracted much attention; suggesting the "wisdom and hopefulness of the Christian message", it has inspired poets such as William Wordsworth and was called "the most poetic simile in Bede":

The present life man, O king, seems to me, in comparison with that time which is unknown to us, like to the swift flight of a sparrow through the room wherein you sit at supper in winter amid your officers and ministers, with a good fire in the midst whilst the storms of rain and snow prevail abroad; the sparrow, I say, flying in at one door and immediately out another, whilst he is within is safe from the wintry but after a short space of fair weather he immediately vanishes out of your sight into the dark winter from which he has emerged. So this life of man appears for a short space but of what went before or what is to follow we are ignorant. If, therefore, this new doctrine contains something more certain, it seems justly to deserve to be followed.

Noteworthy is Bede's summation of the nature of Edwin's reign as King of Northumbria:

It is told that at the time there was so much peace in Britannia, that whenever King Edwin's power extended, as is said proverbially right up to today, even if a woman with a recently born child wanted to walk across the whole island, from sea to sea, she could do so without anyone harming her.

Kershaw indicates that "Bede's decision to couch Edwin's peace in proverbial terms offers ...a chilling insight into the levels of lawlessness accepted in eighth-century England". Furthermore, a definition of "peace" is to be understood as "freedom from robbery, rape, or violence; security to travel at will and to literally 'go in peace.'"

Edwin's conversion and Eorpwald's were reversed by their successors, and in the case of Northumbria the Roman Paulinus appears to have had very little impact. Indeed, by expelling British clergy from Elmet and elsewhere in Edwin's realm, Paulinus may have weakened the Church rather than strengthening it. Very few Roman clergy were present in Paulinus's time, only James the Deacon being known, so that the "conversion" can have been only superficial, extending little beyond the royal court. Paulinus's decision to flee Northumbria at Edwin's death, unlike his acolyte James who remained in Northumbria for many years afterwards until his death, suggests that the conversion was not popular, and the senior Italian cleric unloved.

== As overlord ==
The first challenge to Edwin came soon after his marriage-alliance with Kent, concluded at Canterbury in mid-625. By offering his protection to lesser kings, such as the king of Wight, Edwin thwarted the ambitions of Cwichelm of Wessex. Cwichelm's response was to send an assassin, as noted already. Edwin did not immediately respond to this insult, suggesting either that he felt unable to do so, or that Bede's portrayal of him as a rather indecisive ruler is accurate. Following the failed assassination, as noted, Edwin committed himself to Christianity provided only that he was victorious against Cwichelm.

From about 627 onwards, Edwin was the most powerful king among the Anglo-Saxons, ruling Bernicia, Deira and much of eastern Mercia, the Isle of Man, and Anglesey. His alliance with Kent, the subjection of Wessex, and his recent successes added to his power and authority. The imperium, as Bede calls it, that Edwin possessed was later equated with the idea of a Bretwalda, a later concept invented by West Saxon kings in the 9th century. Put simply, success confirmed Edwin's overlordship, and failure would diminish it.

Edwin's supposed foster-brother Cadwallon ap Cadfan enters the record circa 629, but Cadwallon was defeated and either submitted to Edwin's authority or went into exile. With the defeat of Cadwallon, Edwin's authority appears to have been unchallenged for a number of years, until Penda of Mercia and Cadwallon rose against him in 632–633.

Edwin faced Penda and Cadwallon at the Battle of Hatfield Chase in 632 or 633 and was defeated and killed. For a time his body was (allegedly) hidden in Sherwood Forest at a location that became the village of Edwinstowe (trans. Edwin's resting place), his head being eventually buried at York and the rest of his body at Whitby. Of his two grown sons by Cwenburh of Mercia, Osfrith died at Hatfield, and Eadfrith was captured by Penda and killed some time afterwards.

After his death, Edwin's Queen Æthelburg, along with Paulinus, returned to Kent, taking her son Uscfrea, daughter Eanfled, and Osfrith's son Yffi into exile with her. Uscfrea and Yffi were sent to the court of Æthelburg's kinsman Dagobert I, king of the Franks, but died soon afterwards. Eanfled, however, lived to marry her first cousin, King Oswiu, son of Acha and Æthelfrith.

== Death and legacy ==
Saint Edwin of Northumbria

Convert, King, Martyr
- Venerated in: Eastern Orthodox Church, Roman Catholic Church, Anglican Communion
- Feast: 12 October
- Patronage: converts; hoboes; homeless people; kings; parents of large families

Edwin's realm was divided at his death. He was succeeded by Osric, son of Edwin's paternal uncle Ælfric, in Deira, and by Eanfrith, son of Æthelfrith and Edwin's sister Acha, in Bernicia. Both reverted to paganism, and both were killed by Cadwallon; eventually Eanfrith's brother Oswald defeated and killed Cadwallon and united Northumbria once more.

After his death, Edwin came to be venerated as a saint by some, although his cult was eventually overshadowed by the ultimately more successful cult of Oswald, who was killed in 642. They met their deaths in battle against similar foes, the pagan Mercians and the British, thus allowing both of them to be perceived as martyrs; however, Bede's treatment of Oswald clearly demonstrates that he regarded him as an unambiguously saintly figure, a status that he did not accord to Edwin.

Edwin's renown comes largely from his treatment at some length by Bede, writing from an uncompromisingly English and Christian perspective, and rests on his belated conversion to Christianity. His united kingdom in the north did not outlast him, and his conversion to Christianity was renounced by his successors. When his kingship is compared with his pagan brother-in-law Æthelfrith, or to Æthelfrith's sons Oswald and Oswiu, or to the resolutely pagan Penda of Mercia, Edwin appears to be something less than a key figure in Britain during the first half of the 7th century. Perhaps the most significant legacies of Edwin's reign lay in his failures: the rise of Penda and of Mercia, and the return from Irish exile of the sons of Æthelfrith, which tied the kingdom of Northumbria into the Irish sea world for generations.

== See also ==
- List of Catholic saints
- Christianisation of Anglo-Saxon England

== Sources ==
See also External links for primary sources

- Allsopp, Bruce; Clark, Ursula (1969). Historic Architecture of Northumberland. Newcastle upon Tyne: Oriel Press. ISBN 0 85362 062 8.
- Blair, John, "Carlisle" in M. Lapidge et al. (eds), The Blackwell Encyclopedia of Anglo-Saxon England. Blackwell, London, 1999. ISBN 0-631-22492-0
- Campbell, James, "Elements in the Background to the Life of St Cuthbert and his Early Cult" in The Anglo-Saxon State. Hambledon & London, London, 2000. ISBN 1-85285-176-7
- Geoffrey of Monmouth, The History of the Kings of Britain, translated by Lewis Thorpe. Penguin, London, 1966. ISBN 0-14-044170-0
- Gittos, Helen, "Yeavering" in M. Lapidge et al. (1999).
- Hall, J. A., "York" in M. Lapidge et al. (1999).
- Higham, N. J., An English empire: Bede and the early Anglo-Saxon kings. Manchester U.P., Manchester, 1995. ISBN 0-7190-4424-3
- Higham, N. J., "King Edwin of the Deiri: rhetoric and the reality of power in early England," in Helen Geake and Jonathan Kenny (eds), Early Deira: Archaeological studies of the East Riding in the fourth to ninth centuries AD. Oxbow, Oxford, 2000. ISBN 1-900188-90-2
- Higham, N. J., The Kingdom of Northumbria AD 350–1100. Sutton, Stroud, 1993. ISBN 0-86299-730-5
- Holdsworth, Philip, "Edwin, King of Northumbria" in Lapidge et al. (eds) (1999)
- James, Edward, The Franks. Blackwell, Oxford, 1988. ISBN 0-631-17936-4
- Keynes, Simon, "Bretwalda" in M. Lapidge et al. (1999).
- Kirby, D. P. (2000). The Earliest English Kings. London: Unwin. ISBN 0-415-24211-8.
- Lapidge, Michael, "James the Deacon" in M. Lapidge et al. (1999).
- Lapidge, Michael, "Paulinus" in M. Lapidge et al. (1999).
- Marsden, J., Northanhymbre Saga: The History of the Anglo-Saxon Kings of Northumbria. London: Cathie, 1992. ISBN 1-85626-055-0
- Ó Cróinín, Dáibhí, Early Medieval Ireland: 400–1200. Longman, London, 1995. ISBN 0-582-01565-0
- Stancliffe, Clare, "Oswald: Most Holy and Most Victorious King of the Northumbrians" in Clare Stancliffe & Eric Cambridge (eds) Oswald: Northumbrian King to European Saint. Paul Watkins, Stamford, 1995. ISBN 1-871615-51-8
- Stenton, Sir Frank, Anglo-Saxon England. Oxford University Press, Oxford, 1971 (3rd edn) ISBN 0-19-280139-2
- Thacker, Alan, "Membra Disjecta: the Division of the Body and the Diffusion of the Cult" in Stancliffe & Cambridge (1995).
- Wood, Ian, "Conversion" in M. Lapidge et al. (1999).
- Yorke, Barbara (1990). Kings and Kingdoms of Early Anglo-Saxon England. London: Seaby. ISBN 0-415-16639-X.

Edwin of Northumbria House of Deria Born: c. 586 Died: 12 October 632/633
Regnal titles
Preceded by Æthelfrith	King of Deira; 616 – 632/633	Succeeded by Osric
Preceded by Æthelfrith	King of Bernicia; 616 – 632/633	Succeeded by Eanfrith
