= Alex Woolf =

British medieval historian and academic (born 1963)

Alex Woolf FSA Scot
- Born: 1963 (age 62–63); Boxmoor, Hertfordshire, England, United Kingdom
- Occupation: Medieval historian
- Notable work: New Edinburgh History of Scotland

Alex Woolf FSA Scot (born 12 July 1963) is a British medieval historian and academic. He specialises in the history of Britain and Ireland and to a lesser extent Scandinavia in the Early Middle Ages, with a particular emphasis on interaction and comparison across traditional ethnic boundaries. He is a senior lecturer at the University of St Andrews.

He is author of volume two in the New Edinburgh History of Scotland, covering the period between 789 and 1070. For this he won the 2008 Saltire Society award for "history book of the year".

He is the younger brother of the ancient historian Greg Woolf.

== Education ==
Woolf first went to University to study Scandinavian Studies at University College London, including spending time in Norway, but dropped out before completing the degree and spent four years working in service-sector jobs. He then proceeded to the University of Sheffield, where he completed a degree in Medieval History and Medieval English. In 1992, he completed an M.Phil. in Sheffield's Department of Prehistory and Archaeology, supervised by John Moreland, entitled "The Transition from Late Prehistoric to Early Historic Social and Political Structures amongst the Irish".

== Academic career ==
In 1995, Woolf was appointed a lecturer in archaeology at the University of Wales, Lampeter. From 1997 to 2001, he was a lecturer in Celtic and early Scottish history and culture at the University of Edinburgh. In 2001, he moved to the University of St Andrews as a lecturer in history, where he was promoted to senior lecturer and, in 2010, awarded a Ph.D. by publication portfolio. In 2023 he was characterised by the St Andrews student newspaper as "one of the most beloved members of the Medieval History faculty".

== Selected works ==
- Woolf, Alex (1997). "At Home in the Long Iron Age: A Dialogue between Households and Individuals in Cultural Reproduction", in Invisible People and Processes: Writing Gender and Childhood into European Archaeology, ed. by Jenny Moore and Eleanor Scott (London: Leicester University Press), pp. 68–74
- Woolf, Alex (2003). "The Britons: From Romans to Barbarians", in Regna and Gentes: The Relationship between Late Antique and Early Medieval Peoples and Kingdoms in the Transformation of the Roman World, ed. by Hans-Werner Goetz, Jörg Jarnut and Walter Pohl with Sören Kaschke, The Transformation of the Roman World, 13 (Leiden: Brill), pp. 345–80.
- Woolf, Alex (2004). "Caedualla Rex Brettonum and the passing of the Old North", Northern History 41.1, 1–20
- Woolf, Alex, ed. (2005). Beyond the Gododdin: dark age Scotland in medieval Wales: the Proceedings of a Day Conference Held on 19 February 2005. St Andrews: University of St. Andrews, Committee for Dark Age Studies. ISBN 978-0951257388.
- Woolf, Alex, ed. (2006). Landscape and environment in Dark Age Scotland. St Andrews: The Committee for Dark Age Studies, University of St Andrews. ISBN 978-0951257364.
- "Dun Nechtain, Fortriu and the Geography of the Picts"; Scottish Historical Review 2006; 85(2): 182-201
- "The expulsion of the Irish from Dyfed"; Ireland and Wales in the Middle Ages; Karen Jankulak, Jonathan Wooding (ed); Four Courts Press 2007; 102-115
- Woolf, Alex (2007). From Pictland to Alba, 789-1070 (New Edinburgh History of Scotland). Edinburgh: Edinburgh University Press. ISBN 978-0748612345.
- Woolf, Alex, ed. (2009). Scandinavian Scotland, 20 Years After: the proceedings of a day conference held on 19 February 2007. St Andrews: University of St. Andrews, Committee for Dark Age Studies. ISBN 978-0951257371.
