= Eanfrith of Bernicia =

King of Bernicia (590–634)

Eanfrith
- Eanfrith of Bernicia

King of Bernicia
- Reign: 633–634
- Predecessor: Edwin
- Successor: Oswald
- Born: c. 590
- Died: 634 (aged 43–44)
- Spouse: Pictish princess
- Issue: Talorcan of the Picts
- Father: Æthelfrith of Northumbria
- Mother: Acha of Deira
- Religion: Baptised as a Christian, but reconverted to paganism after becoming king

Eanfrith (590–634) was briefly King of Bernicia from 633 to 634. His father was Æthelfrith, a Bernician king who had also ruled Deira to the south before being killed in battle around 616 against Raedwald of East Anglia, who had given refuge to Edwin, an exiled prince of Deira. His mother was Acha of Deira.

Edwin became king of Northumbria upon Æthelfrith's death, and Eanfrith, who was, according to Bede, the eldest of Æthelfrith's sons, went into exile to the north. In his Ecclesiastical History of the English People, Bede writes that "For all the time that Edwin reigned, the sons of the aforesaid Etheifrid [Æthelfrith], who had reigned before him, with many of the nobility, lived in banishment among the Scots or Picts, and were there instructed according to the doctrine of the Scots, and received the grace of baptism."

Eanfrith married a Pictish princess and had a son, Talorcan, who later became a king of the Picts (653–657). Edwin was killed by the army of Cadwallon ap Cadfan of Gwynedd and Penda of Mercia at the Battle of Hatfield Chase in October 633, and Eanfrith, taking the opportunity to return home, became king of Bernicia. He did not, however, rule Deira, which was held by a relative of Edwin, Osric. Bede tells us that as soon as Eanfrith became king, he "renounced and lost" his faith and returned to the "abominations" of his "former idols".

It is possible that Eanfrith was initially cooperative with Cadwallon. The historian D. P. Kirby, pointing to Eanfrith's evident ability to quickly exploit Edwin's death, has speculated that "a wide-ranging set of alliances" that included both Cadwallon and Eanfrith may have existed. If there was a friendly relationship between Eanfrith and Cadwallon at first, however, it must not have lasted, since Bede reports that Eanfrith went to Cadwallon "with only twelve chosen soldiers" in an attempt to negotiate peace, but Cadwallon had him killed.

The year in which he and Osric ruled was subsequently deemed so abhorrent because of their paganism that it was decided to add that year to the length of the reign of the Christian Oswald of Bernicia (Eanfrith's brother), who defeated Cadwallon and came to rule both Bernicia and Deira, so as to ignore the brief reigns of Eanfrith and Osric.
