= Deira =

Kingdom in the north of early Anglo-Saxon Britain

Kingdom of Deira
- c. 450–654
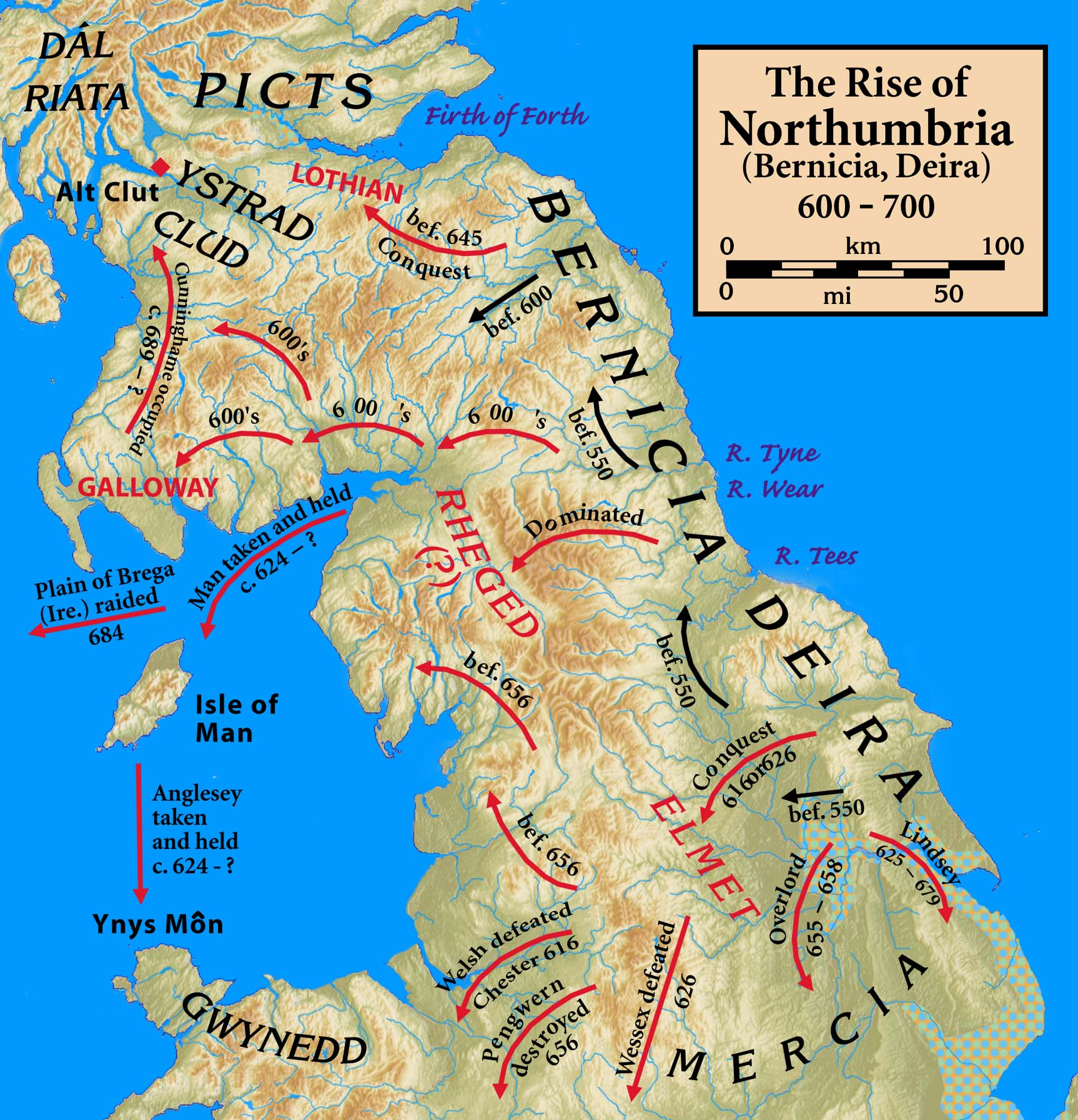
- Capital: York
- Common languages: Northumbrian Old English, Common Brittonic
- Religion: Paganism, Christianity
- Government: Monarchy
- Historical era: Early Medieval
  - Established: c. 450
  - Shared crown with Bernicia: 604
  - merged with Bernicia: 654
Preceded by	Succeeded by
Sub-Roman Britain; Parisi (tribe)	Northumbria

Deira (/ˈdaɪrə, ˈdɛərə/ DY-rə, DAIR-ə;Old English: Dere or Dera rice) was an area of Post-Roman Britain, and a later Anglian kingdom.

== Etymology ==
The name of the kingdom is of Brythonic origin, and is derived from the Proto-Celtic *daru, meaning 'oak' (derw in modern Welsh), in which case it would mean 'the people of the Derwent', a derivation also found in the Latin name for Malton, Derventio. It is cognate with the modern Irish word doire (pronounced [ˈd̪ˠɛɾʲə]); the names of the Irish cities of Derry and Kildare stem from this word.

The Old English Dere is plural, meaning 'Deirans'. The kingdom is recorded as Dera rice; 'Realm of the Deirans'.

== History ==
=== Brythonic Deira ===
Following the Roman withdrawal from Britain a number of successor kingdoms rose in northern England, reflecting pre-Roman tribal territories. The area between the Humber and River Tees known as Deywr or Deifr corresponds to the tribal lands of the Parisi, bordered to the west and north by the Brythonic kingdoms of Elmet (Elfed) and Bernicia (Bryneich) respectively, and to the east by the North Sea.

Early Deira may have centred on Petuaria (modern Brough) and archaeological evidence shows that the town was refortified. Petuaria was a great tribal centre for the Parisi, but declined in importance from the mid-fourth century (possibly as the harbour silted up). After this period, Derventio (modern Malton) may have functioned as the region's capital.

It is not known if Deira was ever an independent Brythonic kingdom, and no British king has been identified with the area from the surviving genealogies, poems or chronicles. However the area was subject to the same fractious inheritance traditions and changing power dynamic (following the Roman withdrawal) that allowed Elmet and Bernicia to become independent hereditary kingdoms in the early fifth century. In Welsh literature, Deira was part of the Hen Ogledd (The Old North) region, which was divided into many related kingdoms after the death of Coel Hen (Coel the Old).

=== Anglian Deira ===
The kingdom, which was previously ruled by a British dynasty, was probably created in the third quarter of the fifth century when Anglian warriors invaded the Derwent Valley. Anglian Deira's territory also extended from the Humber to the Tees, and from the sea to the western edge of the Vale of York. It later merged with the kingdom of Bernicia, its northern neighbour, to form the kingdom of Northumbria.

According to Simeon of Durham (writing early in the 12th century), Deira extended from the Humber to the Tyne, but the land was waste north of the Tees. The Brythonic kingdom centred on Eboracum ("boar-place"), which may have also been called Ebrauc. After the city was taken by King Edwin of the Angles, it became Eoforwic, the capital of the new Anglian kingdom.

Archaeology suggests that the Anglian royal house was in place by the middle of the fifth century, but the first certainly recorded king is Ælla in the late sixth century. After his death, Æthelfrith, king of Bernicia, took control of Deira in 604 and united the two kingdoms into Northumbria. Æthelfrith ruled until the accession of Ælla's son Edwin, in 616 or 617, who also ruled both kingdoms until 633.

Osric, the nephew of Edwin, ruled Deira after Edwin, but his son Oswine was put to death by Oswiu in 651. For a few years subsequently, Deira was governed by Æthelwald son of Oswald of Bernicia.

Bede wrote of Deira in his Historia Ecclesiastica (completed in 731).

=== Anglian kings of Deira ===
Reign	Incumbent		Notes
559/560 to 589	Ælla (Aelli)	ÆLLA YFFING DERA CYNING; ÆLLA REX DEIRA	
589/599 to 604	Æthelric (Aedilric)	ÆÞELRIC IDING BEORNICA ⁊ DERA CYNING; ÆÞELRIC REX BERNICIA ET DEIRA	
Bernicia Dynasty
593/604? to 616	Æthelfrith	ÆÞELFERÞ ÆÞELRICING DERA CYNING; ÆÞELFERÞ REX DEIRA	Killed in battle
Deira Dynasty
616 to 12/14 October 632	Edwin	EDVVIN ÆLLING BEORNICA ⁊ DERA CYNING; EDVVIN REX BERNICIA ET DEIRA	Killed in battle by Cadwallon of Gwynedd and Penda of Mercia
late 633 to summer 634	Osric	OSRIC ÆLFRICING DERA CYNING; OSRIC REX DEIRA	
Bernicia Dynasty
633 to 5 August 642	Oswald	OSVVALD BEORNICA ⁊ DERA CYNING; OSVVALD REX BERNICIA ET DEIRA	Killed by Penda, King of Mercia; Saint Oswald
642 to 644	Oswiu	OSVVIO ÆÞELFRIÞING BEORNICA ⁊ DERA CYNING; OSVVIO REX BERNICIA ET DEIRA	
Deira Dynasty
644 to 651	Oswine	OSVVINE OSRICING DERA CYNING; OSVVINE REX DEIRA	Murdered
Bernicia Dynasty
summer 651 to late 654 or 655	Æthelwold	ÆÞELVVALD OSVVALDING DERA CYNING; ÆÞELVVALD REX DEIRA	
654 to 15 August 670	Oswiu	OSVVIO ÆÞELFERÞING NORÞANHYMBRA CYNING; OSVVIO REX NORÞANHYMBRA	Restored
656 to 664	Alchfrith	ALCHFRIÞ DERA CYNING; ALCHFRIÞ REX DEIRA	
664 to 670	Ecgfrith	ECGFRIÞ DERA CYNING; ECGFRIÞ REX DEIRA	
670 to 679	Ælfwine	ÆLFVVINE DERA CYNING; ÆLFVVINE REX DEIRA	

== Sources ==
- Grundy, John (2022). History of Northumberland. Newcastle upon Tyne: Tyne Bridge Publishing. ISBN 9781838280970.
- Malam, John (2011). Yorkshire, A Very Peculiar History. Book House. ISBN 978-1907184574.
