= AD 679 =

Calendar year

679 in various calendars
- Gregorian calendar: 679; DCLXXIX
- Ab urbe condita: 1432
- Armenian calendar: 128; ԹՎ ՃԻԸ
- Assyrian calendar: 5429
- Balinese saka calendar: 600–601
- Bengali calendar: 85–86
- Berber calendar: 1629
- Buddhist calendar: 1223
- Burmese calendar: 41
- Byzantine calendar: 6187–6188
- Chinese calendar: 戊寅年 (Earth Tiger); 3376 or 3169 — to — 己卯年 (Earth Rabbit); 3377 or 3170
- Coptic calendar: 395–396
- Discordian calendar: 1845
- Ethiopian calendar: 671–672
- Hebrew calendar: 4439–4440
- Hindu calendars
- Vikram Samvat: 735–736
- Shaka Samvat: 600–601
- Kali Yuga: 3779–3780
- Holocene calendar: 10679
- Iranian calendar: 57–58
- Islamic calendar: 59–60
- Japanese calendar: Hakuchi 30 (白雉３０年)
- Javanese calendar: 571–572
- Julian calendar: 679; DCLXXIX
- Korean calendar: 3012
- Minguo calendar: 1233 before ROC 民前1233年
- Nanakshahi calendar: −789
- Seleucid era: 990/991 AG
- Thai solar calendar: 1221–1222
- Tibetan calendar: ས་ཕོ་སྟག་ལོ་ (male Earth-Tiger); 805 or 424 or −348 — to — ས་མོ་ཡོས་ལོ་ (female Earth-Hare); 806 or 425 or −347

Year 679 (DCLXXIX) was a common year starting on Saturday of the Julian calendar. The denomination 679 for this year has been used since the early medieval period, when the Anno Domini calendar era became the prevalent method in Europe for naming years.

== Events ==
=== By place ===
==== Byzantine Empire ====
- Emperor Constantine IV signs a peace treaty, of a nominal 30-year duration, with Caliph Mu'awiya I of the Umayyad Caliphate. Constantine pays an annual tribute of 3,000 (nomismata) pounds of gold, 50 horses and 50 slaves. The Arab garrisons are withdrawn from their bases on the Byzantine coastlands, including Crete & Cyzicus.

==== Europe ====
- December 23 – King Dagobert II is murdered in a hunting accident, near Stenay-sur-Meuse (Ardennes), probably on orders from Pepin of Herstal, the mayor of the palace of Austrasia. He is succeeded by Theuderic III, who becomes sole ruler of the Frankish Kingdom.

==== Britain ====
- King Æthelred of Mercia marries Princess Osthryth, sister of King Ecgfrith of Northumbria (approximate date).

==== Americas ====
- Nuun Ujol Chaak, an ajaw of the Maya city of Tikal, is by this year deceased, after his final defeat at the hands of Bʼalaj Chan Kʼawiil, during the Second Tikal–Calakmul War.

=== By topic ===
==== Religion ====
- Adomnán, clerical lawyer, becomes abbot of the monastery of Iona Abbey, located on the island of Iona (modern Scotland).
- October 2 – Leodegar, bishop of Autun, is tortured and executed by Neustrian nobles at Fécamp (Normandy).

== Births ==
- Sima Zhen, Chinese historian (d. 732)
- Zachary, pope of the Catholic Church (d. 752)

== Deaths ==
- June 23 – Æthelthryth, queen of Northumbria
- October 2, Leodegar, bishop of Autun
- December 23 – Dagobert II, king of Austrasia
- Ælfwine, king of Deira (approximate date)
- Amandus, bishop and saint (b. ca. 584)
- Cenn Fáelad mac Ailella, Irish scholar
- Dai Zhide, chancellor of the Tang dynasty
- Sigebert IV, Frankish prince (approximate date)
- Xu Yushi, chancellor of the Tang dynasty
