= Coenred of Mercia =

King of Mercia from 704 to 709

Coenred

King of Mercia
- Reign: 704–709
- Predecessor: Æthelred
- Successor: Ceolred
- Dynasty: Iclingas
- Father: Wulfhere
- Mother: Eormenhild
- Religion: Christian

Coenred (also spelled Cenred or Cœnred fl. 675–709) was king of Mercia from 704 to 709. Mercia was an Anglo-Saxon kingdom in the English Midlands. He was a son of the Mercian king Wulfhere, whose brother Æthelred succeeded to the throne in 675 on Wulfhere's death. In 704, Æthelred abdicated in favour of Coenred to become a monk.

Coenred's reign is poorly documented, but a contemporary source records that he faced attacks from the Welsh. Coenred is not known to have married or had children, although later chronicles describe him as an ancestor of Wigstan, a 9th-century Mercian king. In 709, Coenred abdicated and went on pilgrimage to Rome, where he remained as a monk until his death. In the view of his contemporary, Bede, Coenred "who had ruled the kingdom of Mercia for some time and very nobly, with still greater nobility renounced the throne of his kingdom". Æthelred's son Ceolred succeeded Coenred as king of Mercia.

== Mercia in the 7th century ==
The kingdoms of Britain in the late 7th century

By the 7th century, England was divided into kingdoms ruled almost entirely by the Anglo-Saxons, who had come to Britain two hundred years earlier. The kingdom of Mercia occupied what is now the English Midlands. Neighbouring kingdoms included Northumbria to the north, East Anglia to the east, and Wessex, the kingdom of the West Saxons, to the south. Essex, the kingdom of the East Saxons, included London and lay between East Anglia and the kingdom of Kent. The earliest Mercian king for whom there is definite historical information is Penda of Mercia, Coenred's paternal grandfather.

The main source for this period is Bede's Historia ecclesiastica gentis Anglorum (Ecclesiastical History of the English People), completed in about 731. Despite its focus on the history of the church, this work provides valuable information about the early Anglo-Saxon kingdoms. Charters, which recorded royal grants of land to individuals and to religious houses, provide further information on Coenred's reign, as does the Anglo-Saxon Chronicle, compiled in Wessex at the end of the 9th century. The Chronicle's anonymous scribe appears to have incorporated much information recorded in earlier periods. Coenred is also mentioned in two 8th-century hagiographies, those of Saint Wilfrid and Saint Guthlac.

== Ancestry and reign ==
In 658, Coenred's father Wulfhere came to the throne of Mercia as the result of a coup, ending a three-year period of Northumbrian control. Wulfhere was succeeded on his death (in 675) by his brother Æthelred, Coenred's uncle, possibly because Coenred was too young to rule. Coenred's mother Ermenilda became a nun sometime after Wulfhere's death. Æthelred's decisive victory over the Northumbrians at the Battle of the Trent in 679, followed by the Picts' destruction of the Northumbrian army at the Battle of Dun Nechtain in 685, reduced Northumbrian power and influence. There is evidence of Mercian activity in the south-east as well. Æthelred invaded Kent in 676, and charters survive in which he confirmed land grants made by Swæfheard and Oswine, kings of west and east Kent. Another charter of Æthelred's, dated between 693 and 704, grants land to Waldhere, the bishop of London. However, Æthelred does not appear to have sought expansion further south. The growing strength of the West Saxons under Cædwalla and Ine would have limited Mercian opportunities in that direction.

Coenred's family tree

The Anglo-Saxon Chronicle records that in 702 Coenred succeeded to the kingdom of the Southumbrians and that in 704 he became king of Mercia. As the "Southumbrians" were those who lived south of the Humber, Mercia's northern boundary, the two annals have proved difficult to interpret: Coenred and Æthelred may have ruled jointly for two years before Æthelred abdicated, or the chroniclers may have recorded the same event twice, once from a source that was two years in error. According to the 8th-century life of St Guthlac, Æthelred appointed Coenred as his heir despite having at least one son of his own, Ceolred. Æthelred appears to have retained influence during his nephew's reign: the Life of St Wilfrid relates how he summoned Coenred and made him swear to support Wilfrid in his conflict with the church hierarchy.

Coenred's sparsely documented reign is mentioned in the Life of Guthlac. The author, Felix, reports conflicts with the Britons: "in the days of Coenred King of the Mercians, [...] the Britons the implacable enemies of the Saxon race, were troubling the English with their attacks, their pillaging, and their devastations of the people [...]" To counter such attacks, Æthelbald, who came to the throne in 716, was once thought to have built Wat's Dyke, an earthwork barrier in northern Wales; but this now seems unlikely, since an excavation of the Dyke in 1997 found charcoal from a hearth which was radiocarbon-dated to some time between 411 and 561.

Some surviving charters from Coenred's reign reveal him to have been the overlord of the East Saxon rulers. Offa, an East Saxon king, made a grant in the territory of the Hwicce (to which he may have been connected by a marriage of his father, Sigeheard) which was later confirmed by Coenred. In the charter, Coenred refers to Offa as his underking. Coenred and his successor also confirmed grants to Waldhere, the Bishop of London, evidence that London was firmly under Mercian overlordship. Later Mercian kings treated London as their direct possession, rather than as a province ruled by an underking, but Coenred did not go that far. A grant of land in Herefordshire to a nun named Feleburg has survived, as have forged charters in Coenred's name granting privileges to St Paul's Cathedral, and to the Abbey of Evesham.

Mercia's influence in Kent was limited both before and during Coenred's reign. In a surviving letter (written in 704 or 705), Waldhere, Bishop of London, tells Berhtwald, Archbishop of Canterbury, that Coenred had invited him to a council to be held "about the reconciliation of Ælfthryth". Waldhere refused the invitation as he did not know Berhtwald's opinion on the matter, which was evidently important, although no other reference to it has survived. The letter describes a council to be held at Brentford to mediate between the kings of the East and West Saxons. In the view of the historian Frank Stenton, the letter illuminates the "confused relations of the southern English at a moment when they had no common overlord". The reduced prestige of both Coenred and his successor, Ceolred, may have stirred unrest among the Mercian nobility: Æthelbald was in exile during Ceolred's reign, and the survival of a hostile account of Ceolred may indicate a more general dissatisfaction with the ruling line.

== Abdication and succession ==
Coenred appears to have been a very religious king. Bede tells a story of a companion of Coenred's whose sins led him to damnation despite Coenred's pleas that he should repent and reform. In 709 Coenred abdicated in favour of his cousin Ceolred, son of Æthelred, in order to become a monk in Rome; Bede's story is cited by the medieval chronicler William of Malmesbury as the reason for Coenred's decision, though this is probably guesswork. Coenred was accompanied by the East Saxon king Offa on his journey to Rome, and was made a monk there by Pope Constantine. The Liber Pontificalis, an early record of the lives of Popes, records the arrival of their party: "in his time, two kings of the Saxons came with many others to pray to the apostles; just as they were hoping, their lives quickly came to an end." A later source, the 11th-century Vita Ecgwini, claims that Ecgwine accompanied Coenred and Offa to Rome, but historians have treated this with scepticism.

Historians have generally accepted Bede's report of Coenred's and Offa's abdications, but Barbara Yorke has suggested that they may not have relinquished their thrones voluntarily. There are instances of kings being forcibly removed and placed in holy orders to make them ineligible for kingship; one such was King Osred II of Northumbria, who was forced into a monastery. On the other hand, if Coenred went willingly, as Bede relates, then the apparently friendly relationship between Offa and Coenred, his overlord, makes it clear that the relationship between an overlord and his underking was not hostile in every case.

Coenred was tonsured in Rome, whence he was accompanied by Offa, son of Sighere, king of the East Saxons, and became a monk "at the threshold of the apostles" as Bede had it; he stayed in Rome until his death, the date of which is unknown. He is not recorded as having a wife or children. The Evesham Chronicle kept at Evesham Abbey, however, claims that he was an ancestor of Wigstan. They do not say whether this was through Wigstan's father, Wigmund, son of Wiglaf of Mercia, or through his mother, Ælfflæd, daughter of Ceolwulf I of Mercia.
