= Eowa of Mercia =

7th-century King of Mercia

Eowa
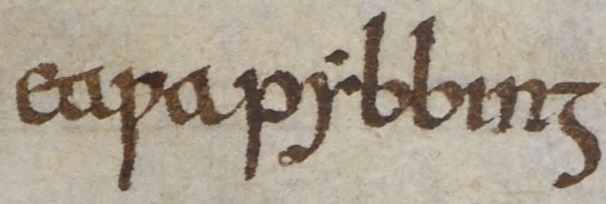
- Eowa's name (spelled Eaƿa, with the letter wynn) in the Anglo-Saxon Chronicle

King of Mercia
- Reign: c. 626 – 5 August 642 AD
- Predecessor: Cearl
- Successor: Penda
- Died: 5 August 642 AD at Maes Cogwy, Powys
- Issue: Alweo; Osmod
- Dynasty: Iclingas
- Father: Pybba

Eowa (or Eawa) (d. 642) was a son of the Mercian king Pybba and a brother of the Mercian king Penda; he was possibly King of Northern Mercia, as the 8th-century Historia Brittonum reports that he was co-ruler with his brother Penda.

== Battle of Maserfield ==
Historia Brittonum, Chapter 65, notes that "[Penda] fought the battle of Cocboy, in which fell Eawa, son of Pybba, his brother, king of the Mercians, and Oswald, king of the North-men, and he gained the victory by diabolical agency." The Annales Cambriae (644) mentions "[t]he battle of Cogfry in which Oswald king of the Northmen and Eawa king of the Mercians fell." These two sources state that Eowa was a king of the Mercians himself at the time of the Battle of Maserfield (or Cogwy), in which he was killed, on August 5 of what was probably the year 642. The later Mercian kings Æthelbald, Offa and Ecgfrith were descended from Eowa; the period of their rule began in 716 following the death of Penda's grandson Ceolred and ended with Ecgfrith's death in December 796.

It was in the battle of Maserfield that Oswald of Northumbria was defeated and killed by the Mercians under Penda. Eowa also died in that battle, although little is known about this. It has been suggested that Eowa may have been a co-ruler of the Mercians alongside Penda, or possibly even superior in status to Penda at this time (if so, this could explain why the Historia Brittonum seems to date Penda's reign from the battle of Maserfield), and that he may have been subject to Oswald and fighting as his ally in the battle. It is possible that it was customary among the Mercians until this time for there to be more than one king, and Penda and Eowa may have ruled over the southern and northern Mercians respectively.

Neither Bede, in his Ecclesiastical History of the English People, nor the Anglo-Saxon Chronicle mentions Eowa's participation or death at Maserfield, or his previously being a Mercian king, but the Chronicle later mentions him when tracing the descent of Æthelbald and Offa.

Nicholas Brooks wrote that, if Eowa is considered to have ruled during the period between roughly 635 and Maserfield, this could account for an obscure recorded Welsh raid into Mercian territory, during which it is said that no mercy was shown to "book-holding monks". Brooks noted that if Eowa was a Northumbrian puppet, there would be the possibility that Oswald may have made moves to promote Christianity in Mercia at this time, thus accounting for the presence of monks in what was still a pagan kingdom. Since Penda is known to history as an ally of the Welsh, this along with the presence of monks makes it seem unlikely that the raid could have taken place during his rule.

== Descendants ==
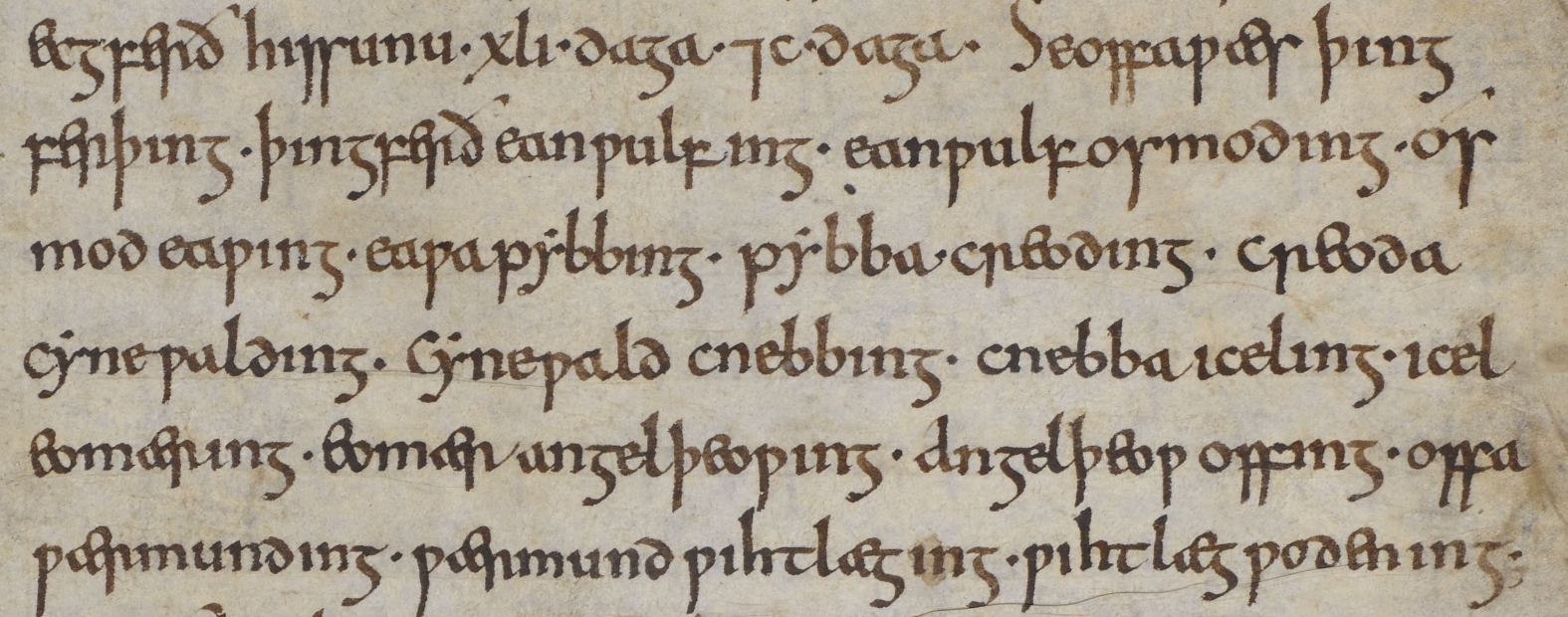
A fragment of the Anglo-Saxon Chronicle, recounting Eowa's descendants (Offa's line).

The Anglo-Saxon Chronicle records the lineage of two Mercian kings of Eowa's blood, Æthelbald and Offa:

"Aethelbald was Alweo's offspring, Alweo Eawa's offspring, Eawa Pybba's offspring...", Later, it gives the lineage of Eowa's great-great-grandson Offa, who ruled from 757 to 796 and was descended from Osmod rather than Eowa's other son Alweo: "That Offa was Thingfrith's offspring, Thingfrith Eanwulf's offspring, Eanwulf Osmod's offspring, Osmod Eawa's offspring, Eawa Pybba's offspring, Pybba Creoda's offspring, Creoda Cynewald's offspring, Cynewald Cnebba's offspring, Cnebba Icel's offspring, Icel Eomer's offspring, Eomer Angeltheow's offspring, Angeltheow Offa's offspring, Offa Wermund's offspring, Wermund Wihtlaeg's offspring, Wihtlaeg Woden's offspring".

== See also ==
- Kings of Mercia family tree
