= Iclingas =

Medieval royal dynasty in England

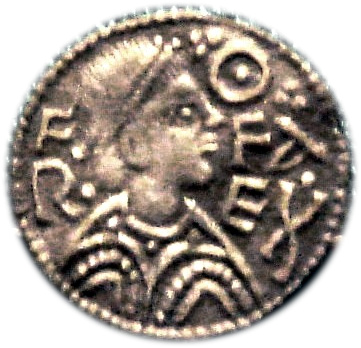
Silver penny of Offa of Mercia

The Iclingas (also Iclings or House of Icel) were a dynasty of Mercian kings during the 7th and 8th centuries, named for Icel or Icil, great-grandson of Offa of Angel, a legendary or semi-legendary figure of the Migration Period who is described as a descendant of the god Woden by the Anglo-Saxon royal genealogies.

The Iclingas reached the height of their power under Offa of Mercia (r. 757–796), who achieved hegemony over the other Anglo-Saxon states, and proclaimed himself "King of the English", but the dynasty lost control of Mercia soon after his death. Penda, who became king of Mercia in about 626 and is the first king named in the regnal lists of the Anglian collection, and at the same time the last pagan king of Mercia, gave rise to a dynasty that supplied at least eleven kings to the throne of Mercia. Four additional monarchs were given an Icling pedigree in later genealogical sources but are now believed to have descended from the family by way of Penda's sister.

Icel himself is of debatable historicity; according to Nicholas Brooks, if historical he would have lived sometime between 450 and 525 and was probably considered the founder of the dynasty because he was the first of his line in Britain. Despite the Icelingas' claims of ties with the rulers and mythic heroes of continental Angeln and with the war-god Woden, Brooks suggests that the Icelingas were, before Penda's rise in prominence, no more and no less royal than any of the other ruling houses of the small Midlands peoples as recorded in the Tribal Hidage and assessed as having between 300 and 600 hides of land. Icel's ancestry in genealogical tradition is as follows: Icel son of Eomer son of Angeltheow son of Offa son of Wermund son of Wihtlæg son, grandson or great-grandson of Woden. In this tradition, Icel is the leader of the Angles who migrated to Britain. Icel is then separated from the establishment of Mercia by three generations: Icel's son was Cnebba, whose son was Cynewald, whose son was Creoda, first king of Mercia.

Matthew Paris s.a. 527 reports, "pagans came from Germania and occupied East Anglia... some of whom invaded Mercia and fought many battles with the British[.]" This date, however, should perhaps be amended to 515. The Vita Sancti Guthlaci ("Life of Saint Guthlac") reports Guthlac of Crowland to have been son of Penwalh, a Mercian who could trace his pedigree back to Icel.

Several place names in England have been suggested as derived from the name of Icel or the Iclingas, including Icklingham, Ickleford, Ickleton and Ixworth. Norman Scarfe noted that the Icknield Way had early spellings Icenhylte weg and Icenhilde weg and suggested a connection between Icklingham and the Iceni, although Warner (1988) has cast doubt on the identification. The name Iclinga survives as "Hickling" and several similar spellings.

== List of kings ==
The following are Iclinga kings of Mercia whose historicity is certain. Creoda of Mercia is of uncertain historicity (if historical, he would date to the end of the 6th century). Cearl of Mercia who ruled during the early 7th century was probably not an Icling.

Ruler	Reign	Biographical notes	Died
Penda	c.626–655	Son of Pybba. Raised Mercia to dominant status amongst the Anglo-Saxon kingdoms. Last pagan ruler of Mercia. Killed in battle by Oswiu.	15 Nov 655
Eowa	c.635–642	Son of Pybba. Co-ruler. Killed in battle.	5 Aug 642
Peada	c.653–656	Son of Penda. Co-ruler in the south-east Midlands. Murdered.	17 Apr 656
Wulfhere	658–675	Son of Penda. Restored Mercian dominance in England. First Christian king of all Mercia.	675
Æthelred I	675–704	Son of Penda. Abdicated and retired to a monastery at Bardney.	716
Cœnred	704–709	Son of Wulfhere. Abdicated and retired to Rome.	?
Ceolred	709–716	Son of Æthelred I. Probably poisoned.	716
Ceolwald	716	Presumed son of Æthelred I (may not have existed).	716
Æthelbald	716–757	Grandson of Eowa. Proclaimed himself King of Britain in 736. Murdered by his bodyguards.	757
Offa	757–796	Great-great-grandson of Eowa. The greatest and most powerful of all Mercian kings, he proclaimed himself King of the English in 774, built Offa's Dyke, and introduced the silver penny.	26 or 29 Jul 796
Ecgfrith	787–796	Son of Offa. Co-ruler, died suddenly a few months after his father.	14 or 17 Dec 796

== Family tree ==
Pybba
Penda	Eowa	Coenwalh
Peada	Wulfhere	Æthelred	Merewalh	Alweo	Osmod	Cundwalh
Coenred	Ceolred	Ceolwald	Æthelbald	Eanulf	Centwine
Thingfrith	Cynreow
Offa	Bassa
Ecgfrith	Cuthberht
Coenwulf	Ceolwulf

== See also ==
- List of monarchs of Mercia
- Kings of the Angles
- Anglo-Saxon royal genealogies
- Wuffingas
