= Council of Austerfield =

8th-century church council in Anglo-Saxon England

The Council of Austerfield was an ecclesiastical synod held at Austerfield, in southern Northumbria in 702 or 703.

The council was called by King Aldfrith of Northumbria to discuss whether Wilfrid should be returned to the see of York from which he had been expelled in 686. Wilfrid had appealed to the papacy around 700, and Pope Sergius I had sent the matter back to Britain to be decided locally. This resulted in Aldfrith convening the council in either 702 or 703 according to different sources. The date of the council has been calculated from two pieces of information: that it took place 22 years after the decision to expel Wilfrid from York, around 679–680, and that Wilfrid had held episcopal office for almost 40 years when Austerfield was convened. This would make the date of the council sometime before 704.

The council was called at a place described as in campo qui Eostrefeld dicitur and in campo qui dicitur Oustraefelda, which has led to the site of the council being identified with Austerfield near Bawtry in South Yorkshire (formerly in the West Riding of Yorkshire). Another possible location is Nosterfield near Ripon in the North Riding of Yorkshire. The main determining factor in favouring Austerfield over Nosterfield is that Nosterfield is not attested as a location before the 13th century.

The council was presided over by Berhtwald, the Archbishop of Canterbury. It was attended by bishops from the entirety of the Anglo-Saxon church, both from Northumbria and from the southern part of Britain. Besides the bishops, abbots from monasteries in Britain are recorded as attending at Austerfield, and Wilfrid's biographer records that Wilfrid was accompanied by a number of priests and deacons. Laymen were also present, including King Aldfrith, as well as some of Aldfrith's thegns.

One account of the council survives, that of Wilfrid's biographer, Stephen of Ripon in the Vita Sancti Wilfrithi. Aldfrith and Berhtwald opposed Wilfrid's desire to return to York, but Wilfrid was supported by King Æthelred of Mercia, who had given Wilfrid shelter while he was in exile. Most of the bishops attending as well as some abbots appear to have opposed Wilfrid. According to Stephen, Wilfrid's opponents wanted to seize all Wilfrid's properties and offices, but Berhtwald offered a compromise that would have allowed Wilfrid to retain some monasteries but would have prevented him from performing the office of bishop. In response, Wilfrid gave a long speech that described all his career as a churchman. The main difficulty lay in Wilfrid's refusal to obey Berhtwald, who had archiepiscopal authority over him. The decision of the council was that Wilfrid should remain exiled from York and return to the monastery of Ripon and not leave and no longer be a bishop. Wilfrid disagreed with this decision and appealed to the papacy again.

Wilfrid was eventually reconciled to the archbishop, bishops and laymen at the Council of Nidd in 705.
