= Kyneburga, Kyneswide and Tibba =

Canonized 7th-century Mercian princesses

Saints Kyneburga, Kyneswide and Tibba

Abbesses
- Died: 7th century
- Venerated in: Catholic Church; Anglican Church; Eastern Orthodox Church
- Canonized: Pre-Congregation
- Feast: 6 March

Kyneburga, Kyneswide and Tibba were female members of the royal family of Mercia in 7th-century England. They are venerated as saints.

== Kyneburga and Kyneswide ==
Kyneburga (d. c. 680) (also called Cyneburh in Old English); the name being also rendered as Kinborough and in occasional use as a Christian name) and Kyneswide (Cyneswitha) were sisters, the daughters of King Penda of Mercia (who remained true to Anglo-Saxon paganism). She was eldest daughter of Penda. Although her father was an opponent of Christianity, she and all her siblings converted. Bede wrote that Penda tolerated the preaching of Christianity in Mercia itself, despite his own beliefs:

"Nor did King Penda obstruct the preaching of the word among his people, the Mercians, if any were willing to hear it; but, on the contrary, he hated and despised those whom he perceived not to perform the works of faith, when they had once received the faith, saying, They were contemptible and wretched who did not obey their God, in whom they believed.

This was begun two years before the death of King Penda. Their mother was Queen Cyneswise. Tibba is believed to have been a relative.

Kyneburga married Alhfrith of Deira, co-regent of Northumbria (who attended the Synod of Whitby in 664), and later founded an abbey for both monks and nuns in Castor, in the Soke of Peterborough. She became the first abbess and was later joined by Kyneswide and Tibba. Kyneswide succeeded Kyneburga as abbess and she was later succeeded by Tibba. She was buried in her church, but the remains of Kyneburga and Kyneswide were translated, before 972, to Peterborough Abbey, now Peterborough Cathedral.

Kyneburga had been one of the signatories, together with her brother Wulfhere, of the founding charter of Burh Abbey, dated 664, per William Dugdale's Monasticon. (Burh Abbey was later dedicated to St Peter, becoming "Peterborough"). She was much esteemed as a saint by the monks of Peterborough, and features as one of the saints remembered annually on 6 March in several ancient Peterborough-produced Kalendars, (a section of a psalter).

She died on 15 September AD 680 and was buried at Castor where she soon became revered as a saint. In 963, her body was moved to Peterborough, with those of her sister, Cuneswitha, and their kins woman, Tibba. Her remains were translated to Thorney Abbey some time later. Her feast day is celebrated on 6 March.

She is remembered in a chapel at Peterborough Cathedral, the 12th-century St Kyneburga's parish church in Castor, Lady Conyburrow's Way (a ridge in a field near Castor), Kimberwell spring, Bedfordshire, the villages of Kimberley, Norfolk and West Yorkshire.

There was another lady by the name of Kyneburg, the wife of Oswald of Northumbria. She was the first abbess at Gloucester.

The only church in the world to be consecrated to St Kyneburgha can be found in the village of Castor & Ailsworth. Consecrated in 1124, its 900th anniversary was commemorated in 2024 with a specially commissioned operetta. Commissioned by incumbent Rector David Ridgeway, the libretto was written by Ian Winfrey and score by Jon Graham.

The premiere of the operetta was staged in the church in October 2024. Originally staged by Director Monique Bointon-Smith and conducted by Kate Wishart, the sisters’ roles were originated by Liz Williams (Kyneburgha), Susannah Sutton (Kyneswide) and Emily Roberts (Tibba)

== Tibba ==
Tibba, patron saint of falconers, is believed to have lived at Ryhall, Rutland, in the 7th century. She was buried there, but in the 11th century her relics were translated to Peterborough Abbey, by Abbot Ælfsige (1006–1042). According to legend, St Tibba was a niece of King Penda. The remains of a small hermitage associated with the saint can be seen on the west side of the north aisle of the Church of St John the Evangelist, Ryhall.

There was at Ryhall a shrine and a holy well dedicated to Saint Tibba. Robert Charles Hope placed the location on the brow of Tibbal's Hill (Tibb's-well-hill), "upon the hill going from Tolethorpe to Belmsford Bridge".

Eabba, a cousin of Tibba, lived with her. Hope suggests the holy well dedicated to her was just north of Tibba's, on the other side of a ford of the River Gwash and the name "St. Eabba's-well-ford was corrupted to Stableford when a bridge was later built there. St. Eabba's well came to be called by local shepherds 'Jacob's well'". Barrie Cox in The Place-Names of Rutland suggests 'St Eabba's well ford' is popular etymology. (For the relationship between St Tibba and St Ebba ("Domne Eafe"), see e.g. Rollason, D.W., The Mildrith Legend A Study in Early Medieval Hagiography in England, Leicester University Press, 1982, p. 77)

== Translation ==
Originally buried at Castor and Ryhall, their relics were bought in the 10th century by Peterborough Abbey under the direction of Abbot Aelfsige of Peterborough, as part of a policy of relic acquisition by the abbey. Their relics at the abbey were lost or destroyed in the Reformation.

== Bibliography ==
- Dunbar, Agnes (1904) A Dictionary of Saintly Women. 2 vols. London: Bell, 1904–1905.
