= Pybba of Mercia =

King of Mercia (570?–606/615)

Pybba
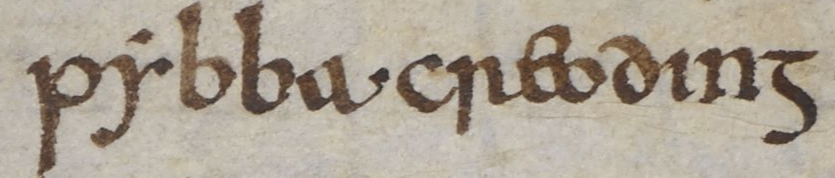
- Pybba's name in the Anglo-Saxon Chronicle

King of Mercia
- Reign: c. 593–606/615 AD
- Predecessor: Creoda
- Successor: Cearl
- Died: 606/615 AD
- Issue: Penda; Eowa; Coenwalh
- Dynasty: Iclingas
- Father: Creoda

Peoples of Britain in AD 600

Pybba (570?–606/615) (also Pibba, Wibba, or Wybba) was an early King of Mercia. He was the son of Creoda and father of Penda and Eowa. Unusually, the names Pybba and Penda are probably of British Celtic origin rather than Germanic.

His dates are sometimes given in genealogies as birth in 570, the beginning of his reign in 593, and death in either 606 or 615, but with no apparent evidence; the Anglo-Saxon Chronicle merely mentions him as the father of Penda, with no additional detail.

Pybba is said by the Historia Brittonum to have had 12 sons. Cearl, a Mercian king, is mentioned by Bede, and may have been Pybba's successor, but his relationship to Pybba, if any, is unknown. Pybba's son Penda eventually became king; the Chronicle gives the date of this as 626, although Bede suggests it was not until after the battle of Hatfield Chase in 633.

Besides Penda and Eowa (who the author of the Historia Brittonum said were the sons of Pybba who were the best known to him), Pybba also apparently had a son named Coenwalh. Every king from Penda until Ceolwulf, who was deposed in 823, was said to be a descendant of Pybba, either through Penda, Eowa, or Coenwalh (perhaps excluding Beornrad, who ruled briefly and whose background is unknown).

Pybba also is said to have had a daughter. Though unnamed, she was possibly the first wife of Cenwalh, King of Wessex (648–674).

== See also ==
- List of monarchs of Mercia

Regnal titles
Preceded by Creoda	King of Mercia c. 593 – 606 or 615	Succeeded by Cearl
