= Osthryth =

Queen of Mercia (d. 697)

Saint Osthryth

Queen of Mercia
- Died: 697
- Venerated in: Catholic Church; Anglican Communion
- Canonized: Pre-congregation
- Major shrine: Bardney Abbey

Osthryth (died 697), queen of the Mercians, was the wife of King Æthelred and daughter of King Oswiu of Northumbria and his second wife Eanflæd. She probably married Æthelred before 679 and was murdered by the nobles of Mercia.

Osthryth was not the first of her family to become a Mercian queen. Her sister Alhflæd had married Peada, King of South Mercia 654–656. After the death of Peada, who was allegedly murdered with Alhflæd's connivance, and possibly Osthryth's as well, she retreated to Fladbury in Worcestershire, to judge both from the place-name, which means "stronghold of Flæde", and from its subsequent history: sometime in the 690s Æthelred granted Fladbury to Oftfor, Bishop of Worcester, to re-establish monastic life there; however, this grant was later contested by Æthelheard, son of Oshere, who maintained that Æthelred had no right to give Fladbury away, as it had been the property of Osthryth. Æthelheard claimed it as her kinsman and heir.

Æthelred and Osthryth loved and favoured Bardney Abbey in Lincolnshire. Osthryth placed there the bones of her uncle Oswald of Northumbria, who was venerated as a saint. It is clear from this story that Osthryth played a part in promoting the cult of St Oswald. Many years later she persuaded Oswald's widow Cyneburh to take the veil.

Osthryth had to contend with major conflicts of loyalty. In 679 her brother Ecgfrith of Northumbria fought a battle against Æthelred, in which Ecgfrith's brother Ælfwine was killed. Bede tells us that he was "a young man of about eighteen years of age and much beloved in both kingdoms, for King Æthelred had married his sister."

The murder of Osthryth in 697 by Mercian nobles is unexplained in the sources that mention it. Ann Williams attributes it to the hostility between the Mercians and the Northumbrians, while D. P. Kirby suggests that it may have been revenge for her sister's alleged involvement in Peada's murder. H. P. R. Finberg speculates that she and her kinsman Oshere were suspected of trying to detach the kingdom of the Hwicce from Mercian overlordship.

Osthryth was buried at Bardney Abbey.

Osthryth was probably the mother of Æthelred's son, Ceolred, king of Mercia from 709 to 716.
