= Ceolwald of Mercia =

8th-century Mercian, possibly king

Ceolwald may have been King of Mercia around 716 AD.

King Ceolred of Mercia, a grandson of Penda, died in 716. Most Mercian king-lists have Ceolred succeeded by Æthelbald, who was not a descendant of Penda. However, one version of the Worcester Cathedral lists has Ceolred succeeded by Ceolwald. From the similarity of their names, Ceolwald is thought to have been Ceolred's brother, and thus the last of Penda's direct descendants to have ruled in Mercia.

Ceolwald can only have been king for a short time as Æthelbald appears to have become king in the year of Ceolred's death.

== See also ==
- Kings of Mercia family tree
