= Battle of the Trent =

7th century battle in the Kingdom of Lindsey

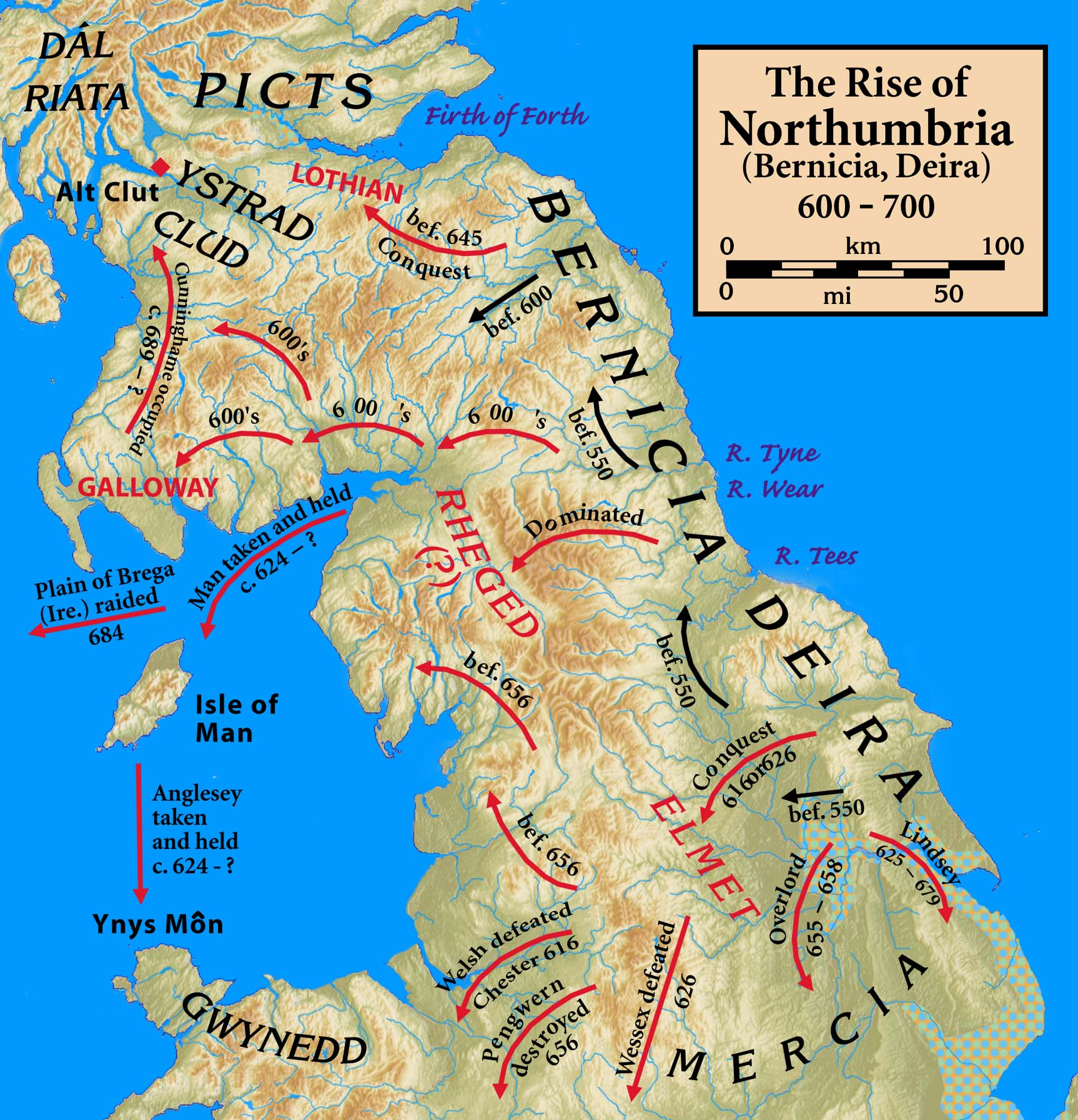
- The Rise of Northumbria, 600 – 700
Date	c. 679
Location	At or near the River Trent (in modern-day England)
Result	Mercian victory

Belligerents
Mercia	Northumbria

Commanders and leaders
Æthelred	Ecgfrith; Ælfwine of Deira †

The Battle of the Trent was fought at an unspecified site near the River Trent within the Kingdom of Lindsey (today part of England), in 679. The battle was fought between the Northumbrian army of King Ecgfrith and the Mercian army of King Æthelred. The Mercians were victorious, ending Northumbrian domination of the area. Lindsey would from then on become a client state of Mercia.

Bede notes in Ecclesiastical History of the English People that the 18-year-old subking, Ælfwine of Deira, was killed in the battle, and that this almost led to further conflict between the two kingdoms, needing the intervention of Theodore, the Archbishop of Canterbury.

In his account of the battle, Bede recounts the tale of a Northumbrian thegn called Imm or Imma, who may have been the founder of the settlement of Immingham. Imma was captured by the Mercians and, proving troublesome, was sold into slavery to a Frisian merchant who, when his identity was discovered, then ransomed him to one of the kings of Kent.
