= Ælfwine of Deira =

Ælfwine

King of Deira
- Reign: 670–679 AD
- Predecessor: Ecgfrith
- Successor: (office abolished)
- Born: c. 661 AD
- Died: 679 AD (at the age of 18); Battle of the Trent
- House: Deira
- Father: Oswiu
- Mother: Eanflæd

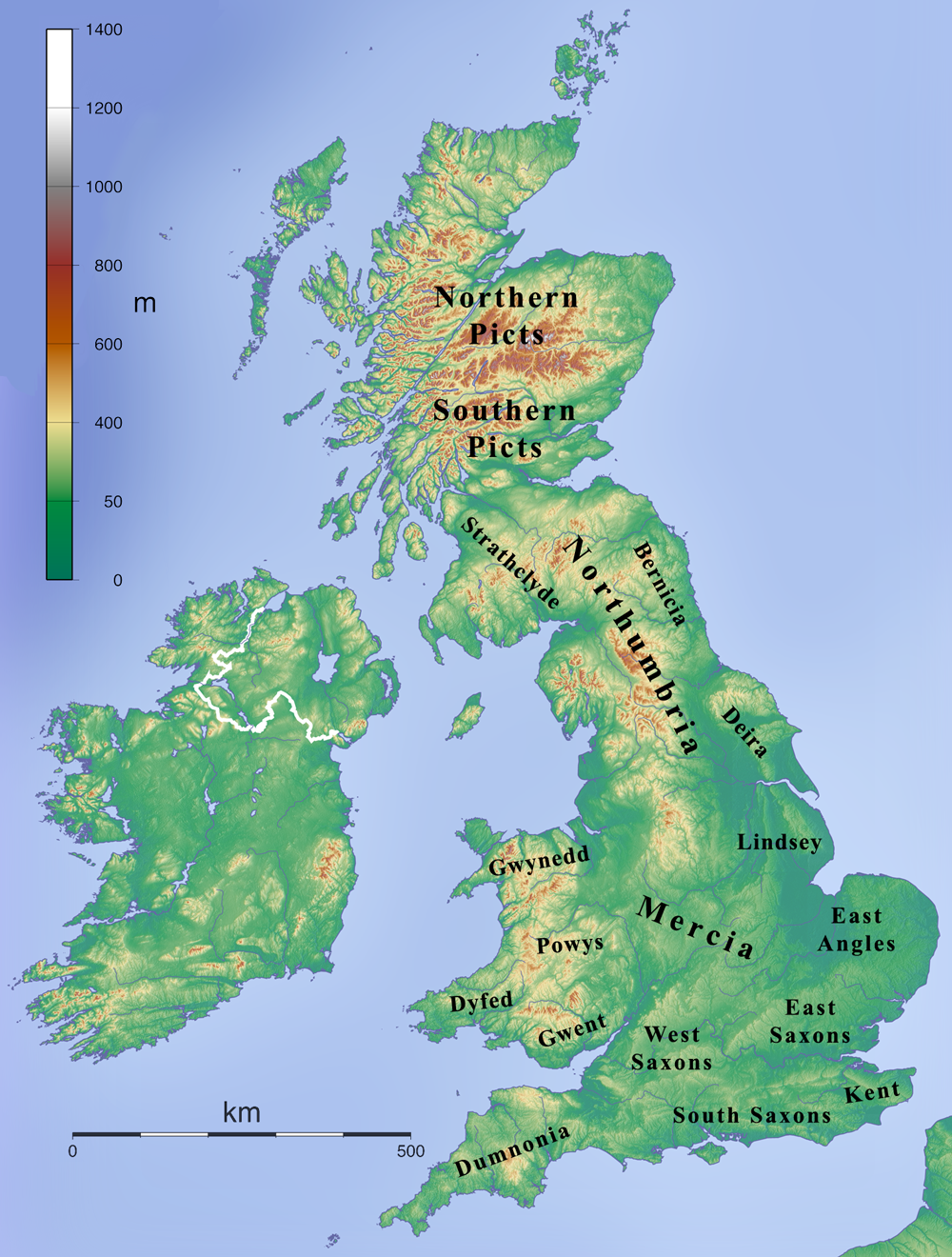
A map depicting the British Isles in the 7th century

Ælfwine (c. 661 – 679) was the King of Deira from 670 to 679. He was a son of Oswiu of Northumbria and a brother of Ecgfrith of Northumbria.

After the succession of Ecgfrith as king of Northumbria in 670, he made Ælfwine king of the sub-kingdom of Deira. Ælfwine was still a boy at the time, and the title may have been intended to designate him as the heir of the childless Ecgfrith. He was, however, killed in battle against the Mercians at the Battle of the Trent in 679. Although his death could have led to an escalation of the war, further conflict was averted by the intervention of the Archbishop of Canterbury, Theodore, and King Æthelred of Mercia paid a weregild to Ecgfrith in compensation for Ælfwine's death.

Bede writes: “In the ninth year of the reign of King Ecgfrith (in 679), a great battle was fought between him and Æthelred, king of the Mercians, near the river Trent, and Ælfwine, brother to King Ecgfrith, was slain, a youth about eighteen years of age, and much beloved by both provinces; for King Æthelred had married his sister Osthryth. There was now reason to expect a more bloody war, and more lasting enmity between those kings and their fierce nations; but Theodore, the bishop, beloved of God, relying on the Divine aid, by his wholesome admonitions wholly extinguished the dangerous fire that was breaking out; so that the kings and their people on both sides were appeased, and no man was put to death, but only the due mulct paid to the king who was the avenger for the death of his brother; and this peace continued long after between those kings and between their kingdoms.”
