= Peada of Mercia =

King of Mercia from 655 to 656

Peada
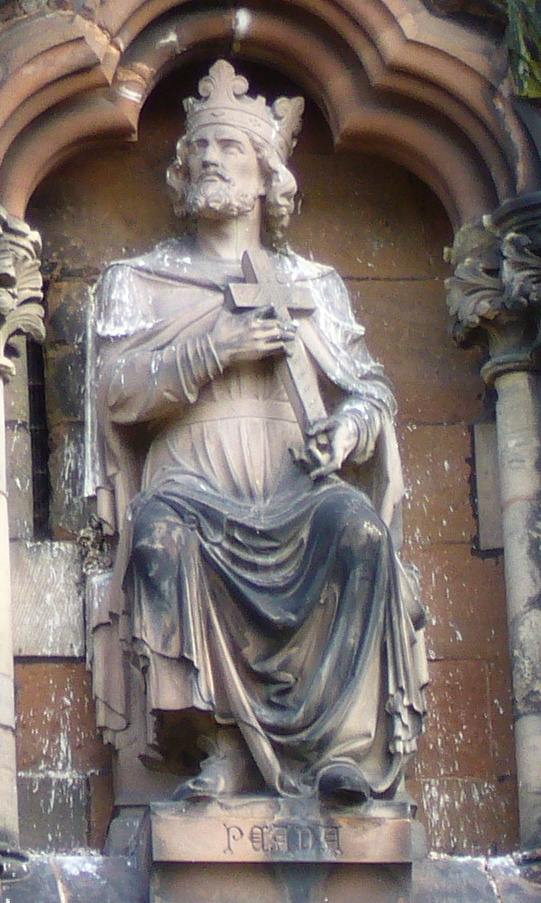
- Peada as portrayed in sculpture at Lichfield Cathedral

King of [Southern] Mercia
- Reign: 654 or 655–656
- Predecessor: Eowa
- Successor: Oswiu
- Died: Spring 656
- Burial: Worcester Cathedral
- Spouse: Alhflæd, daughter of Oswiu
- Dynasty: Iclingas
- Father: Penda
- Mother: Cynewise
- Religion: Pagan; later converted to Christianity by Alhfrith, husband of Cyneburh

Peada (died 656), a son of Penda, was made king of the Middle Angles by Penda in 653. Then, after Penda's death by Oswiu in 655, Oswiu became king of Mercia and split it into two kingdoms, creating a North and South Mercia. Oswiu ruled over the North and made Peada king of Southern Mercia in 655, where most of his subjects already were. This stayed the case for about a year where Peada was then killed by Ealhflæd, his wife and Oswiu's daughter.

== Life ==
Around the year 653, Peada was made king of the Middle Angles by his father, Penda. Bede, describing Peada as "an excellent youth, and most worthy of the title and person of a king", wrote that he sought to marry Ealhflæd of Bernicia, the daughter of King Oswiu of Northumbria; Oswiu, however, made this conditional upon Peada's baptism and conversion to Christianity, along with the Middle Angles (Peada was, at this time, still a pagan, like his father). Bede says that Peada eagerly accepted conversion:

When he heard the preaching of truth, the promise of the heavenly kingdom, and the hope of resurrection and future immortality, he declared that he would willingly become a Christian, even though he should be refused the virgin; being chiefly prevailed on to receive the faith by King Oswy's son Aifrid, who was his relation and friend, and had married his sister Cyneburga, the daughter of King Penda.

Peada was subsequently baptized by Finan of Lindisfarne, and this was followed by a campaign to convert Peada's people:

Accordingly he was baptized by Bishop Finan, with all his earls and soldiers, and their servants, that came along with him, at a noted village belonging to the king, called At the Wall. And having received four priests, who for their erudition and good life were deemed proper to instruct and baptize his nation, he returned home with much joy. These priests were Cedd and Adda, and Betti and Diuma; the last of whom was by nation a Scot, the others English. Adda was brother to Utta, [...] a renowned priest, and abbot of the monastery of Gateshead. The aforesaid priests, arriving in the province with the prince, preached the word, and were willingly listened to; and many, as well of the nobility as the common sort, renouncing the abominations of idolatry, were baptized daily.

On 15 November 655, Oswiu defeated and killed Penda at the Battle of the Winwaed, and consequently he came to exercise power in Mercia. According to Bede, Oswiu allowed Peada to rule the southern part of Mercia; southern Mercia consisted of 5,000 families, Bede reports, while northern Mercia was populated by 7,000 families, and the two were divided by the River Trent.

According to the Anglo-Saxon Chronicle, Peada helped found Medeshamstede, the monastery at Peterborough:

In his time they came together, [Peada] and Oswy, brother of King Oswald, and declared that they wished to establish a minster in praise of Christ and in honor of St Peter. And they did so, and gave it the name Medeshamstede, because there is a spring there called Medeswael. And then they began the foundations and built upon them, and then entrusted it to a monk who was called Seaxwulf. He was a great friend of God, and all people loved him, and he was very nobly born in the world and powerful. He is now much more powerful with Christ.

However, the Chronicle continues, "Peada ruled no length of time, because he was betrayed by his own queen at Eastertide"; Bede also reports that Peada was "very wickedly killed" through his wife's treachery "during the very time of celebrating Easter" in 656. Bede also gives the name of Peada's wife: Ealhflæd, the daughter of Oswiu.

== See also ==
- Kings of Mercia family tree

Regnal titles
| Preceded by Penda | King of Mercia; 655–656 | Succeeded by Oswiu |
