= Pinbury =

Medieval village in Gloucester, England

Coordinates: 51°44′37″N 2°03′43″W

Pinbury was a hamlet in Gloucestershire, England.

Pinbury is mentioned in the Domesday Book as containing 18 households.

Pinbury contains the ruins of a twelfth-century chapel, and possibly the remains of a Roman villa. Following the Norman Conquest, William the Conqueror gave the hamlet to the nuns of Caen in 1082.

In 1416, it was transferred to the Bridgettines of Sion, Middlesex, who had a cell, and upon the suppression, was granted to Andrew, Lord Windsor, in exchange for other lands. From him it passed by purchase to the family of Sir Henry Poole, of Saperton, and from that family to the family of Sir Rob. Atkins; and afterwards from the heir-general of that family, to Lord Bathurst, 1786. In 1803, Henry, Earl Bathurst, was the lord of the manor, with two-thirds of the property of the parish.
