= Wulfhere of Mercia =

King of Mercia from 658 to 675

Wulfhere
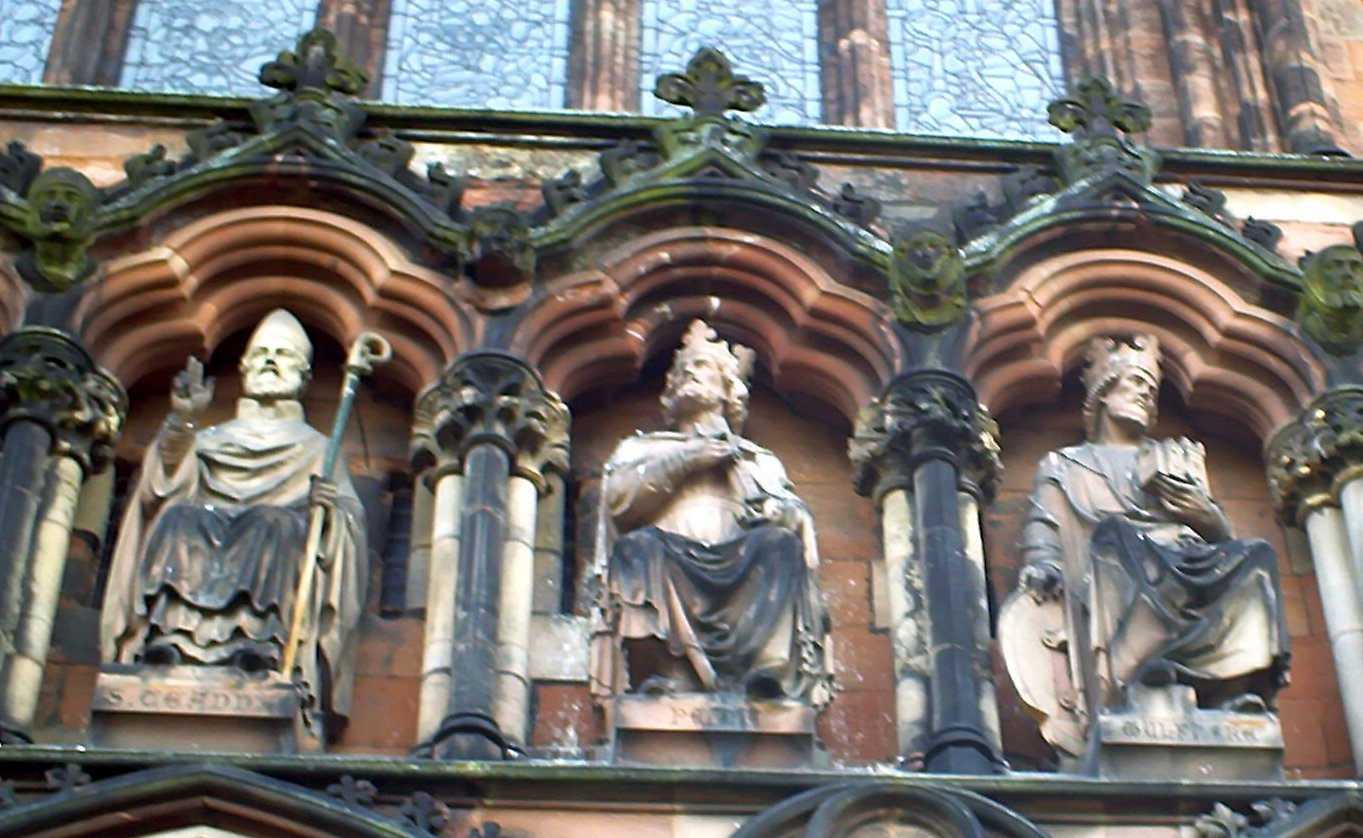
- Depiction of Wulfhere on the right at Lichfield Cathedral.

King of Mercia
- Reign: 658–675 AD
- Predecessor: Oswiu
- Successor: Æthelred
- Born: c. 640 AD
- Died: 675 AD
- Spouses: Eormenhild
- Issue: Coenred; Werburgh
- Dynasty: Iclingas
- Father: Penda
- Mother: Cynewise (possibly)

Wulfhere or Wulfar (died 675) was King of Mercia from 658 until 675 AD. He was the first Christian king of all of Mercia, though it is not known when or how he converted from Anglo-Saxon paganism. His accession marked the end of Oswiu of Northumbria's overlordship of southern England, and Wulfhere extended his influence over much of that region. His campaigns against the West Saxons led to Mercian control of much of the Thames valley. He conquered the Isle of Wight and the Meon valley and gave them to King Æthelwealh of the South Saxons. He also had influence in Surrey, Essex, and Kent. He married Eormenhild, the daughter of King Eorcenberht of Kent.

Wulfhere's father, Penda, was killed in 655 at the Battle of Winwaed, fighting against Oswiu of Northumbria. Penda's son Peada became king under Oswiu's overlordship but was murdered six months later. Wulfhere came to the throne when Mercian nobles organized a revolt against Northumbrian rule in 658 and drove out Oswiu's governors.

By 670, when Oswiu died, Wulfhere was the most powerful king in southern England. He was effectively the overlord of England south of the Humber from the early 660s, although not overlord of Northumbria as his father had been. In 674, he challenged Oswiu's son Ecgfrith of Northumbria, but was defeated. He died, probably of disease, in 675. Wulfhere was succeeded as King of Mercia by his brother, Æthelred. Stephen of Ripon's Life of Wilfrid describes Wulfhere as "a man of proud mind, and insatiable will".

== Mercia in the 7th century ==
Kingdoms of Britain in the late 7th century

England in AD 600 was ruled almost entirely by the Anglo-Saxon peoples who had come to Britain from northwestern Europe over the previous 200 years. The monk Bede, writing in about AD 731, considered the Mercians to be descended from the Angles, one of the invading groups; the Saxons and Jutes settled in the south of Britain, while the Angles settled in the north. Little is known about the origins of the kingdom of Mercia, in what is now the English Midlands, but according to genealogies preserved in the Anglo-Saxon Chronicle and the Anglian collection the early kings were descended from Icel; the dynasty is therefore known as the Iclingas. The earliest Mercian king about whom definite historical information has survived is Penda of Mercia, Wulfhere's father.

According to Bede's Historia ecclesiastica gentis Anglorum, a history of the English church, there were seven early Anglo-Saxon rulers who held imperium, or overlordship, over the other kingdoms. The fifth of these was Edwin of Northumbria, who was killed at the Battle of Hatfield Chase by a combined force including Cadwallon, a British king of Gwynedd and Penda. At the time of this victory, Penda was probably not yet king of Mercia. His children included two future kings of Mercia: Wulfhere and Æthelred.

After Edwin's death, Northumbria briefly fell apart into its two constituent kingdoms - Bernicia and Deira. Within a year Oswald killed Cadwallon and reunited the kingdoms, and subsequently re-established Northumbrian hegemony over the south of England. However, on 5 August 642, Penda killed Oswald at the Battle of Maserfield, probably at Oswestry in the northwest midlands. Penda is not recorded as overlord of the other southern Anglo-Saxon kings, but he became the most powerful of the Anglo-Saxon kings after he defeated Oswald. On Oswald's death, Northumbria was divided again: Oswald's brotherOswiu succeeded to the throne of Bernicia, and Osric's son Oswine to Deira, the southern of the two kingdoms.

The main source for this period is Bede's History, completed in about 731. Despite its focus on the history of the church, this work also provides valuable information about the early pagan kingdoms. For other kingdoms than his native Northumbria, such as Wessex and Kent, Bede had an informant within the ecclesiastical establishment who supplied him with additional information. This does not seem to have been the case with Mercia, about which Bede is less informative than about other kingdoms. Further sources for this period include the Anglo-Saxon Chronicle, compiled at the end of the 9th century in Wessex. The Chronicle's anonymous scribe appears to have incorporated much information recorded in earlier periods.

== Ancestry ==
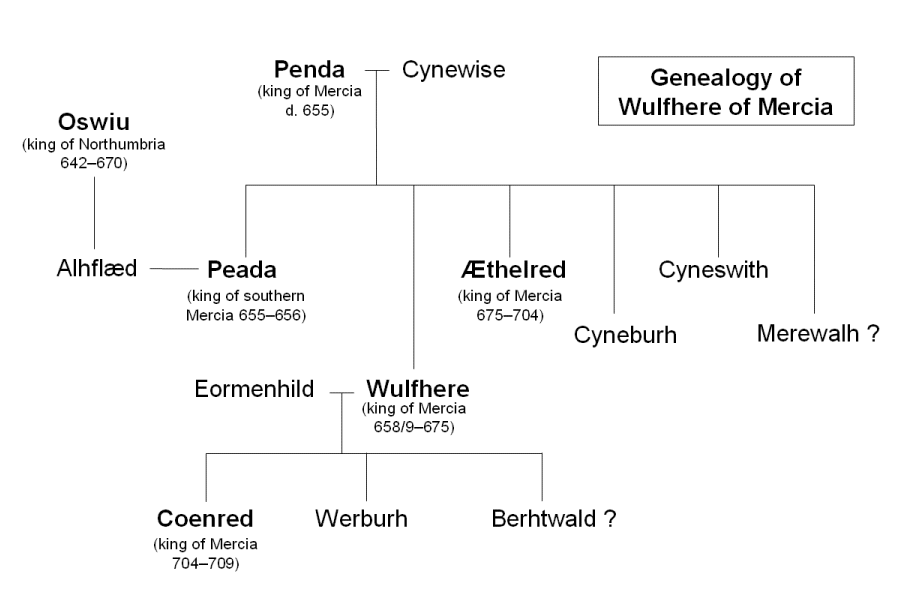
Wulfhere's immediate relations

Wulfhere was the son of Penda of Mercia. Penda's queen, Cynewise, is named by Bede, who does not mention her children; no other wives of Penda are known and so it is likely but not certain that she was Wulfhere's mother. The Anglo-Saxon Chronicle gives Penda's age as fifty in 626, and credits him with a thirty-year reign, but this would put Penda at eighty years old at the time of his death, which is generally thought unlikely as two of his sons (Wulfhere and Æthelred) are recorded as being young when he was killed. It is thought at least as likely that Penda was 50 years old at his death, rather than at his accession. Wulfhere's date of birth is unknown, but Bede describes him as a youth at the time of his accession in 658, so it is likely he was in his middle teens at that time; Penda would then have been in his thirties at the time Wulfhere was born.

Nothing is known of Wulfhere's childhood. He had two brothers, Peada and Æthelred, and two sisters, Cyneburh and Cyneswith; it is also possible that Merewalh, king of the Magonsæte, was Wulfhere's brother. He married Eormenhild of Kent; no date is recorded for the marriage and there is no record of any children in the earliest sources, though Coenred, who was king of Mercia from 704 to 709, is recorded in John of Worcester's 12th-century chronicle as Wulfhere's son. Another possible child is Berhtwald, a subking who is recorded as a nephew of Æthelred, and a third child, Werburh, is recorded in an 11th-century manuscript as a daughter of Wulfhere. An 11th-century history of St. Peter's Monastery in Gloucester names two other women, Eadburh and Eafe, as queens of Wulfhere, but neither claim is plausible.

== Accession and overlordship ==
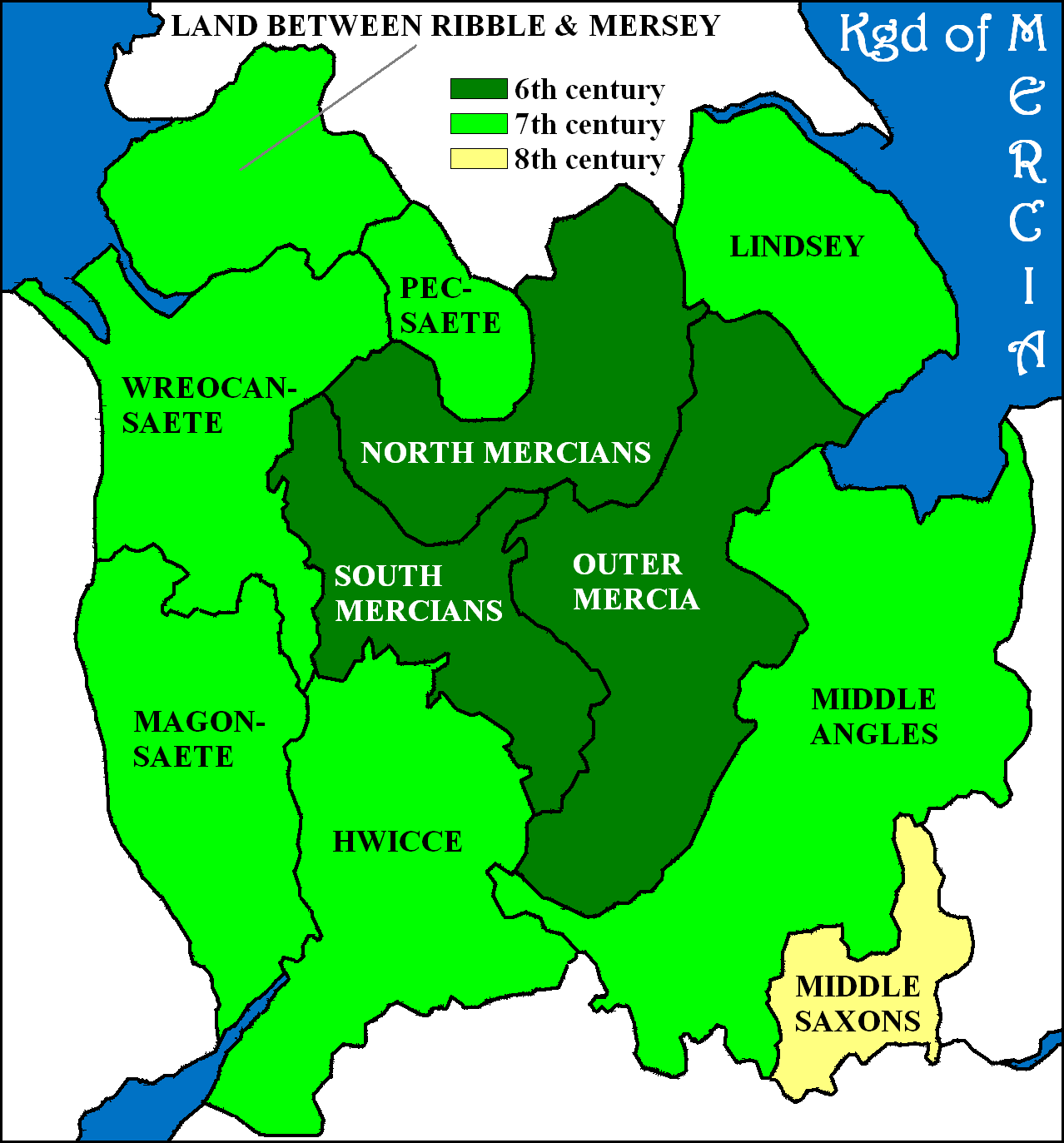
The Kingdom of Mercia at its greatest extent (7th to 9th centuries) is shown in green, with the original core area (6th century) given a darker tint. The areas shown are approximate.

In 655 Penda besieged Oswiu of Northumbria at Iudeu, the location of which is unknown but which may have been Stirling, in Scotland. Penda took Oswiu's son, Ecgfrith, as hostage, and Oswiu paid tribute, in the form of treasure, to secure Penda's departure. On the way back to Mercia, Oswiu overtook Penda and on 15 November 655 Oswiu and Penda fought on the banks of the (unidentified) River Winwaed. Penda was killed and beheaded by Oswiu, who divided Mercia into northern and southern halves. The northern portion was kept under direct Northumbrian control; the southern kingdom was given to Penda's son Peada, who had married Oswiu's daughter Ealhflæd ca 653.

Peada did not remain king long. He was murdered at Easter in 656, perhaps with the connivance of his wife, Oswiu's daughter. Oswiu then ruled all Mercia himself. Bede lists Oswiu as the seventh and last king to hold imperium (or bretwalda in the language of the Anglo-Saxon Chronicle) over the other Anglo-Saxon kingdoms. Overlordship was a common relationship between kingdoms at this time, often taking the form of a lesser king under the domination of a stronger one. Oswiu went further than this, however, and installed his own governors in Mercia after the deaths of Penda and Peada. This attempt to establish close control of Mercia failed in 658 when three Mercian leaders, Immin, Eafa and Eadbert, rebelled against the Northumbrians. Bede reports that they had kept Wulfhere in hiding, and when the revolt succeeded Wulfhere became king. It has been suggested that the Mercian revolt succeeded because Oswiu may have been occupied with fighting in Pictland, in northern Britain. His nephew the Pictish king Talorgan, son of Eanfrith, had died in 657.

How much direct control Oswiu exerted over the southern kingdoms during his imperium is unclear. Bede describes Oswiu's friendship and influence over Sigeberht of the East Saxons, but generally the pattern in the southeast is of more local domination, with Oswiu's influence unlikely to have been particularly strong. Wulfhere appears to have taken over Oswiu's position in many instances. Bede does not list him as one of the rulers who exercised imperium, but modern historians consider that the rise to primacy of the kingdom of Mercia began in his reign. He seems to have been the effective overlord of Britain south of the Humber from the early 660s, though not overlord of Northumbria as his father had been.

A document called the Tribal Hidage may date from Wulfhere's reign. Drawn up before many smaller groups of peoples were absorbed into the larger kingdoms, such as Mercia, it records the peoples of Anglo-Saxon England, along with an assessment in hides, a unit of land. The Tribal Hidage is difficult to date precisely; it may have been written down in Wulfhere's reign, but other suggested origins include the reign of Offa of Mercia, or Edwin or Oswiu of Northumbria.

== A convert king ==
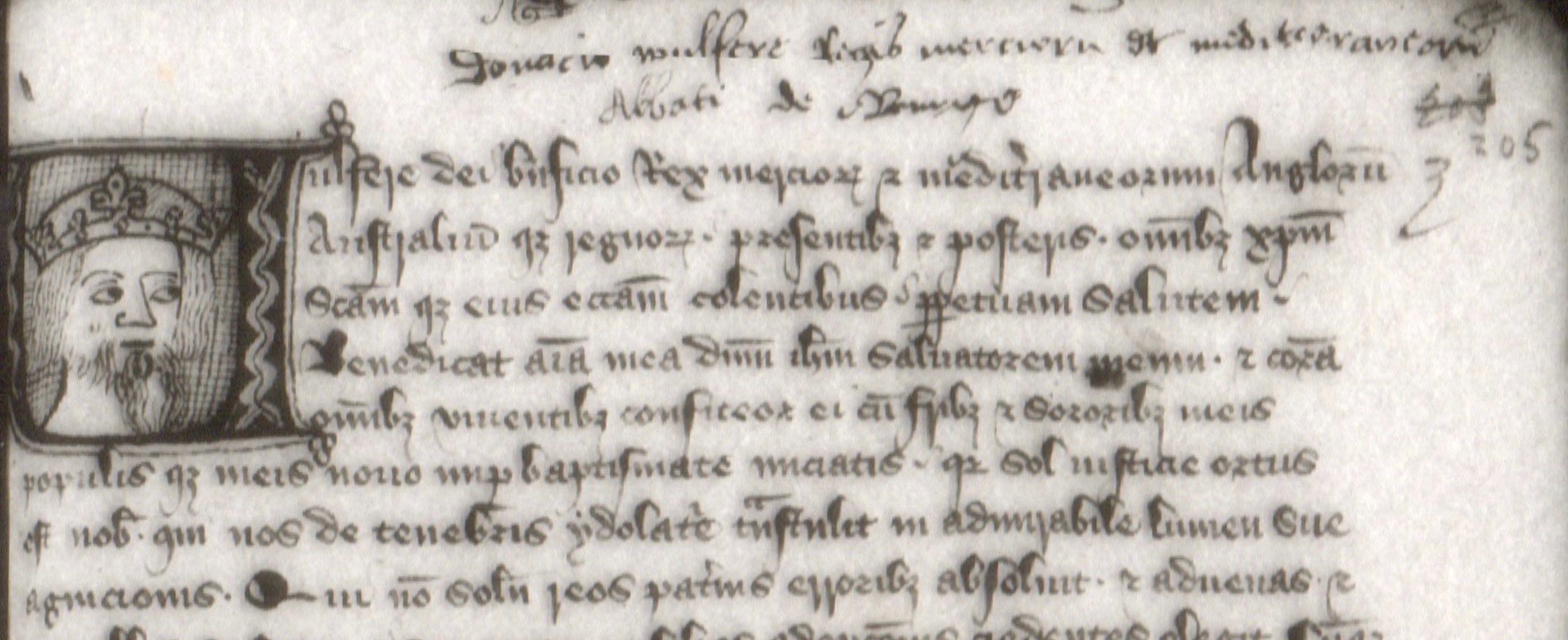
Detail of a 14th-century transcription of an Anglo-Saxon charter that purports to have been issued by Wulfhere, in favour of the monastery at Medeshamstede: a depiction of the king appears in the initial capital letter "U".

Britain had been Christianised under the Romans, but the incoming Anglo-Saxons practiced their indigenous religion (Anglo-Saxon paganism) and the church in Great Britain was limited to the surviving British kingdoms in Scotland and Wales, and the kingdom of Dumnonia in the southwest of England. Missionaries from Rome began converting the Anglo-Saxons to Christianity at the end of the 6th century, and this process was well under way in Penda's reign, though Penda himself remained pagan throughout his life. Records survive of the baptism of other kings at this time—Cynegils of Wessex was baptised in about 640, for example, and Edwin of Northumbria was converted in the mid 620s. However, later kings, such as Cædwalla of Wessex, who ruled in the 680s, are recorded as pagan at their accession.

Bede writes that after Wulfhere became king: "Free under their own king, they [the Mercians] gave willing allegiance to Christ their true king, so that they might win his eternal kingdom in heaven". While Wulfhere's father had refused to convert to Christianity, and Peada had apparently converted in order to marry Oswiu's daughter, the date and the circumstances of Wulfhere's conversion are unknown. It has been suggested that he adopted Christianity as part of a settlement with Oswiu. Bede records that two years before Penda's death, his son Peada converted to Christianity, influenced partly by Oswiu's son Ealhfrith, who had married Peada's sister Cyneburh. Peada brought a Christian mission into Mercia, and it is possible that this was when Wulfhere became a Christian. Wulfhere's marriage to Eormenhild of Kent would have brought Mercia into close contact with the Christian kingdoms of Kent and Merovingian Gaul, which were connected by kinship and trade. The political and economic benefits of the marriage may therefore also have been a factor in Wulfhere's Christianisation of his kingdom.

Wulfhere's relationship with Bishop Wilfrid is recorded in Stephen of Ripon's Life of Wilfrid. During the years 667–69, while Wilfrid was at Ripon, Wulfhere frequently invited him to come to Mercia when there was need of the services of a bishop. According to Stephen, Wulfhere rewarded Wilfrid with "many tracts of land", in which Wilfrid "soon established minsters for servants of God".

According to the Anglo-Saxon Chronicle, Wulfhere endowed a major monastery at Medeshamstede, in modern Peterborough. The monastery had initially been endowed by Peada; for the dedication of Wulfhere's gift both Archbishop Deusdedit (died 664), and Bishop Jaruman (held office from 663), were present. The endowment was signed by Wulfhere and Oswiu, and by Sigehere and Sæbbi, the Kings of Essex.

== West Saxons, South Saxons and Hwicce ==
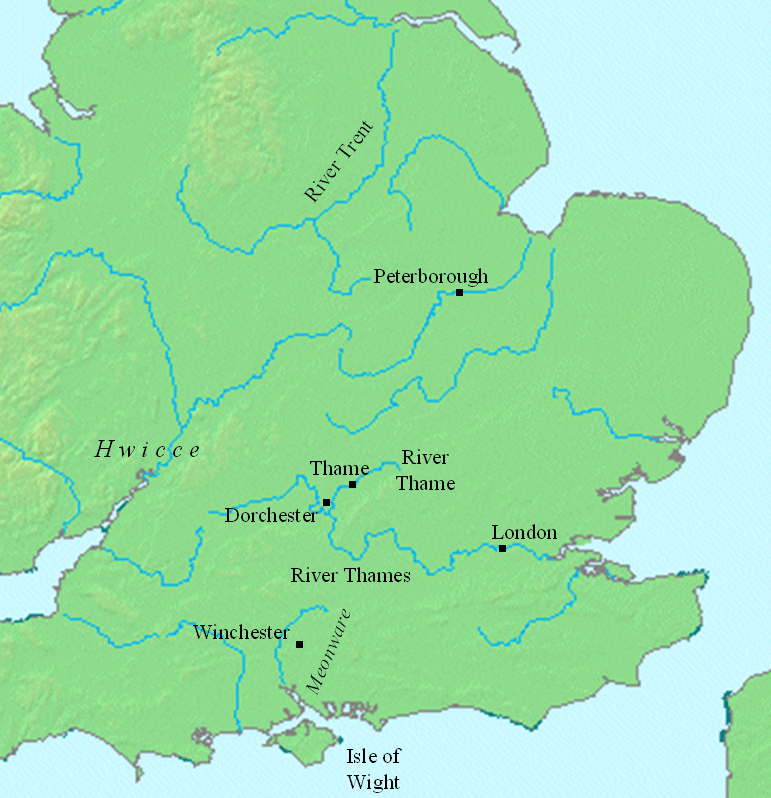
A map of southern England, showing locations mentioned in early sources about Wulfhere. The exact location of Ashdown is unknown, but it was somewhere on the Berkshire Downs, south of Thame.

In 661, Wulfhere is recorded in the Chronicle as harrying Ashdown, in West Saxon territory. The Gewisse, thought to be the original group from which the West Saxons came, appear to have originally settled in the upper Thames valley, and what records survive of the 6th century show them active in that region. The Mercian resurgence under Wulfhere placed them under severe pressure. Also in the early 660s, the West Saxon see of Dorchester, in the same area, was divided, and a new bishopric set up at Winchester. This decision was probably a reaction to the advance of the Mercians into the traditional heartland of the West Saxons, leaving Dorchester dangerously close to the border. Within a few years, the Dorchester see was abandoned; the exact date is not known, but it was probably in the mid 660s.

In addition to the attack on Ashdown, Wulfhere raided the Isle of Wight in 661. He subsequently gave both the island and the territory of the Meonware, which lay along the river Meon, on the mainland north of the Isle of Wight, to his godson King Æthelwealh of the South Saxons. It seems likely that the ruling dynasty on the island found these arrangements acceptable to some degree, since the West Saxons, under Cædwalla, exterminated the whole family when they launched their own attack on the island in 686. After the conquest of the Isle of Wight, Wulfhere ordered the priest Eoppa to provide baptism to the inhabitants. According to the Chronicle, this was the first time Christian baptism had reached the island.

In the early 670s, Cenwealh of Wessex died, and perhaps as a result of the stress caused by Wulfhere's military activity the West Saxon kingdom fragmented and came to be ruled by underkings, according to Bede. Eventually these underkings were defeated and the kingdom reunited, probably by Cædwalla but possibly by Centwine. A decade after Wulfhere's death, the West Saxons under Cædwalla began an aggressive expansion to the east, reversing much of the Mercian advance.

In addition to being Wulfhere's godson, King Æthelwealh of the South Saxons had a connection to the Mercians via marriage. His wife was Queen Eafe, the daughter of Eanfrith of the Hwicce, a tribe whose territory lay to the southwest of Mercia. The Hwicce had their own royal family, but it appears that at this date they were already subordinate to Wulfhere: the marriage between Æthelwealh and Eafe may well have taken place at Wulfhere's court, since it is known Æthelwealh was converted there. The kingdom of the Hwicce is sometimes regarded as a creation of Penda's, but it is equally likely that the kingdom existed independently of Mercia, and that Penda and Wulfhere's increasing influence in the area represented an extension of Mercian power rather than the creation of a separate entity.

== East Anglia and the East Saxons ==
In 664, Æthelwald of East Anglia died, and was succeeded by Ealdwulf, who reigned for fifty years. Almost nothing is known of Mercian relations with East Anglia during this time; East Anglia had previously been dominated by Northumbria, but there is no evidence that this continued after Wulfhere's accession. Swithhelm of the East Saxons also died in 664; he was succeeded by his two sons, Sigehere and Sæbbi, and Bede describes their accession as "rulers ... under Wulfhere, king of the Mercians". A plague the same year caused Sigehere and his people to recant their Christianity, and according to Bede, Wulfhere sent Jaruman, the bishop of Lichfield, to reconvert the East Saxons. Jaruman was not the first bishop of Lichfield; Bede mentions a predecessor, Trumhere, but nothing is known about Trumhere's activities or who appointed him.

It is apparent from these events that Oswiu's influence in the south had waned by this time, if not before, and that Wulfhere now dominated the area. This becomes even clearer in the next few years, as some time between 665 and 668 Wulfhere sold the see of London to Wine, who had been expelled from his West Saxon bishopric by Cenwealh. London fell within the East Saxons' territory in that period. From the archaeological evidence, it appears to be about this time that the Middle Saxon settlement in London began to expand significantly; the centre of Anglo-Saxon London was not at the old Roman centre, but about a mile west of that, near what is now the location of the Strand. Wulfhere may have been in control of the city when this expansion began.

== Kent, Surrey and Lindsey ==
Eorcenberht was the king of Kent at Wulfhere's accession, and the two families became connected when Wulfhere married Eorcenberht's daughter Eormenhild. In 664 Eorcenberht's son Egbert succeeded to the Kentish throne. The situation in Kent at Egbert's death in 673 is not clearly recorded. It appears that a year passed before Hlothhere, Egbert's brother, became king. Wulfhere may have had an interest in the succession, as through his marriage to Eormenhild he was the uncle of Egbert's two sons, Eadric and Wihtred. It has been speculated that Wulfhere acted as the effective ruler of Kent in the interregnum between Egbert's death and Hlothhere's accession. Another Mercian connection to Kent was through Merewalh, the king of the Magonsæte, and hence a subking under Wulfhere. Merewalh, who may have been Wulfhere's brother, was married to Hlothhere's sister, Eormenburh.

Surrey is not recorded as ever having been an independent kingdom, but was at least a province that was under the control of different neighbours at different times. It was ruled by Egbert until the early 670s, when a charter shows Wulfhere confirming a grant made to Bishop Eorcenwald by Frithuwold, a sub-king in Surrey, which may have extended north into modern Buckinghamshire. Frithuwold himself was probably married to Wilburh, Wulfhere's sister. The charter, made from Thame, is dated between 673 and 675, and it was probably Egbert's death that triggered Wulfhere's intervention. A witness named Frithuric is recorded on a charter in the reign of Wulfhere's successor, Æthelred, making a grant to the monastery of Peterborough, and the alliteration common in Anglo-Saxon dynasties has led to speculation that the two men may have both come from a Middle Anglian dynasty, with Wulfhere perhaps having placed Frithuwold on the throne of Surrey. The charter is witnessed by three other subkings, named Osric, Wigheard, and Æthelwold; their kingdoms are not identified but the charter mentions Sonning, a province in what is now eastern Berkshire, and it may be that one of these subkings was a ruler of the Sunningas, the people of that province. This would in turn imply Wulfhere's domination of that province by that time.

Wulfhere's influence among the Lindesfara, whose territory, Lindsey, lay in what is now Lincolnshire, is known from information about episcopal authority. At least one of the Mercian bishops of Lichfield is known to have exercised authority there: Wynfrith, who became bishop on Chad's death in 672. In addition it is known that Wulfhere gave land at Barrow upon Humber, in Lindsey, to Chad, for a monastery. It is possible that Chad also had authority there as bishop, probably no later than 669. It may be that the political basis for Mercian episcopal control of the Lindesfara was laid early in Wulfhere's reign, under Trumhere and Jaruman, the two bishops who preceded Chad.

== Defeat and death ==
When Wulfhere attacked Oswiu's son Ecgfrith in 674, he did so from a position of strength. Stephen of Ripon's Life of Wilfrid says that Wulfhere "stirred up all the southern nations against [Northumbria]". Bede does not report the fighting, nor is it mentioned in the Anglo-Saxon Chronicle, but according to Stephen, Ecgfrith defeated Wulfhere, forcing him to surrender Lindsey, and to pay tribute.

Wulfhere survived the defeat but evidently lost some degree of control over the south as a result; in 675, Æscwine, one of the kings of the West Saxons, fought him at Biedanheafde. It is not known where this battle was, or who was the victor. Henry of Huntingdon, a 12th-century historian who had access to versions of the Anglo-Saxon Chronicle now lost, believed that Mercians had been the victors in a "terrible battle" and remarks upon Wulfhere having inherited "the valour of his father and grandfather". Kirby, however, presumes Æscwine was sufficiently successful to break Wulfhere's hold over Wessex.

Wulfhere died later in 675. The cause of death, according to Henry of Huntingdon, was disease. He would have been in his mid-thirties. His widow, Eormenhild, is thought to have later become the abbess of Ely. Æthelred, Wulfhere's brother, succeeded to the throne and reigned for nearly thirty years. Æthelred recovered Lindsey from the Northumbrians a few years after his accession, but he was generally unable to maintain the domination of the south achieved by Wulfhere.

== Marriage and children ==
At an unrecorded date Wulfhere married Eormenhild (alias Ermenilda, etc.), a daughter of Eorcenberht, King of Kent, who survived him and is thought after his death to have become the Abbess of Ely. No issue from the marriage are recorded in the earliest sources, however the following children are recorded by various other sources:

- Coenred, King of Mercia from 704 to 709, is recorded in John of Worcester's 12th-century chronicle as Wulfhere's son.
- Berhtwald, a sub-king who is recorded as a nephew of Æthelred,
- Werburh (alias Werburga, etc.), recorded in an 11th-century manuscript as a daughter of Wulfhere.
- Saint Wulfad, who having been led by a white hart whilst out hunting in a forest with his brother Ruffin, to the hermitage of Saint Chad, was converted by that saint to Christianity. This caused great displeasure of his father, who had relapsed to paganry, and slew both his sons for their actions. Wulfad was slain by his father at Stone, in Staffordshire, and Ruffin at Burston. Their mother founded Stone Priory on the spot of the burial of both her sons.
- Ruffin, slain by his father at Burston, for having converted to Christianity.

== Sources ==
=== Primary sources ===
- Bede, Ecclesiastical History of the English People. (c. 731 A.D.) Translated by Leo Sherley-Price, revised R.E. Latham, ed. D.H. Farmer. London: Penguin, 1990. ISBN 0-14-044565-X
- Colgrave, Bertram (1927). The Life of Bishop Wilfred by Eddius Stephanus. London: Cambridge University Press.
- Forrester, Thomas (1991). The Chronicle of Henry of Huntingdon. Felinfach: Llanerch Press. ISBN 0-947992-55-3.
- Swanton, Michael (1996). The Anglo-Saxon Chronicle. New York: Routledge. ISBN 0-415-92129-5.
- Whitelock, Dorothy (1968). English Historical Documents v.l. c.500–1042. London: Eyre & Spottiswoode.

=== Secondary sources ===
- Baker, Nigel; Holt, Richard (2004). Urban Growth and the Medieval Church: Gloucester and Worcester. Gloucester: Ashgate. ISBN 0-7546-0266-4.
- Blair, John (2006). The Church in Anglo-Saxon Society. Oxford: Oxford University Press. ISBN 0-19-921117-5.
- Campbell, John (1991). "The First Christian Kings". In Campbell, James; et al. (eds.). The Anglo-Saxons. Penguin Books. ISBN 0-14-014395-5.
- Featherstone, Peter (2001). "The Tribal Hidage and the Ealdormen of Mercia". In Michelle Brown; Carole Farr (eds.). Mercia: An Anglo-Saxon Kingdom in Europe. Leicester: Continuum. ISBN 0-8264-7765-8.
- Higham, N. J. (1993). An English Empire: Bede and the early Anglo-Saxon kings. Manchester: Manchester University Press. ISBN 0-7190-4424-3.
- Higham, N. J. (1997). The Convert Kings: Power and religious affiliation in early Anglo-Saxon England. Manchester: Manchester University Press. ISBN 0-7190-4828-1.
- Keynes, Simon (2001). "Wulfhere". In Michael Lapidge (ed.). The Blackwell Encyclopedia of Anglo-Saxon England. Oxford: Blackwell Publishing. ISBN 0-631-22492-0.
- Kirby, D.P. (1992). The Earliest English Kings. London: Routledge. ISBN 0-415-09086-5.
- Williams, Ann (1999). Kingship and Government in Pre-Conquest England, c. 500–1066. Basingstoke: Macmillan. ISBN 0-333-56798-6.
- Yorke, Barbara (1990). Kings and Kingdoms of Early Anglo-Saxon England. London: Seaby. ISBN 1-85264-027-8.
- Zaluckyj, Sarah (20 October 2001). Mercia: The Anglo-Saxon Kingdom of Central England. Logaston: Logaston Press. ISBN 1-873827-62-8.
