= Cearl of Mercia =

7th-century King of Mercia

Cearl (or Ceorl) was an early king of Mercia who ruled during the early part of the 7th century, until about 626. He is the first Mercian king mentioned by Bede in his Historia ecclesiastica gentis Anglorum. Bede was a Northumbrian who was hostile to Mercia, and historian Robin Fleming speculates that as "ceorl" means "rustic" in Old English, his name may have been a joke.

Cearl's ancestry is unknown. He is not included in the Mercian royal genealogy; Henry of Huntingdon in the 12th century placed him as ruling after Pybba, saying that he was not Pybba's son but was his kinsman.

Bede (2.14) mentions him only in passing, as the father-in-law of Edwin of Deira. According to Bede, Edwin married Cwenburh (Quenberga), daughter of "Cearl, king of the Mercians" while he was in exile, and with her had two sons, Osfrith and Eadfrith. Historians have noted the marriage as evidence for Cearl's independence from the then-Northumbrian king Æthelfrith, since Edwin was Æthelfrith's rival and Cearl would not have married his daughter to an enemy of his overlord. The Historia Brittonum credits the later king Penda with first separating the Mercians from the Northumbrians, but if Cearl was able to make this marriage to Æthelfrith's enemy he must not have been subject to him—possibly any subject relationship only developed at a later date. The historian D. P. Kirby speculated that perhaps Cearl was enabled to marry his daughter to Edwin due to the protection of the powerful East Anglian king Raedwald, and that Edwin's subsequent exile among the East Angles may have been due to Æthelfrith's power beginning "to impinge on Cearl or his successors among the Mercians".

It has been suggested that Cearl's kingship suffered a catastrophe between the time of the Battle of Chester around 616 and the appearance of his successor, Penda, son of Pybba. It is possible that Cearl may have been involved in that conflict, which may have effectively ended his overkingship of Mercia until the rise of Penda.

Whether Cearl reigned until Penda became king is unknown. Penda was in power by 633 (and possibly by 626, if the Anglo-Saxon Chronicle is correct). It is also unknown what relationship Cearl had to Penda, if any. That Cearl married his daughter to Edwin could be evidence that he and Penda were rivals, since Penda later fought against and defeated Edwin (in alliance with King Cadwallon of Gwynedd).

More evidence could be seen for a dynastic rivalry between Cearl and Penda in Penda's later execution (according to Bede) of Eadfrith, a captured son of Edwin who was Cearl's grandson through Cwenburh. Although Penda's reason is unknown, the killing of Eadfrith is often seen as the result of pressure from the Northumbrian king Oswald, to whom Eadfrith would have represented a threat; it is, however, also possible that Penda may have decided that Eadfrith's lineage made him unsuitable for use as a puppet against Oswald, since he would represent a threat to Penda's own position through his descent from Cearl.

== See also ==
- Kings of Mercia family tree

== Notes and references ==
Regnal titles
Preceded by Pybba	King of Mercia; 606 or 615 – c. 626	Succeeded by Penda
