= Ceolred of Mercia =

King of Mercia from 709 to 716

Ceolred
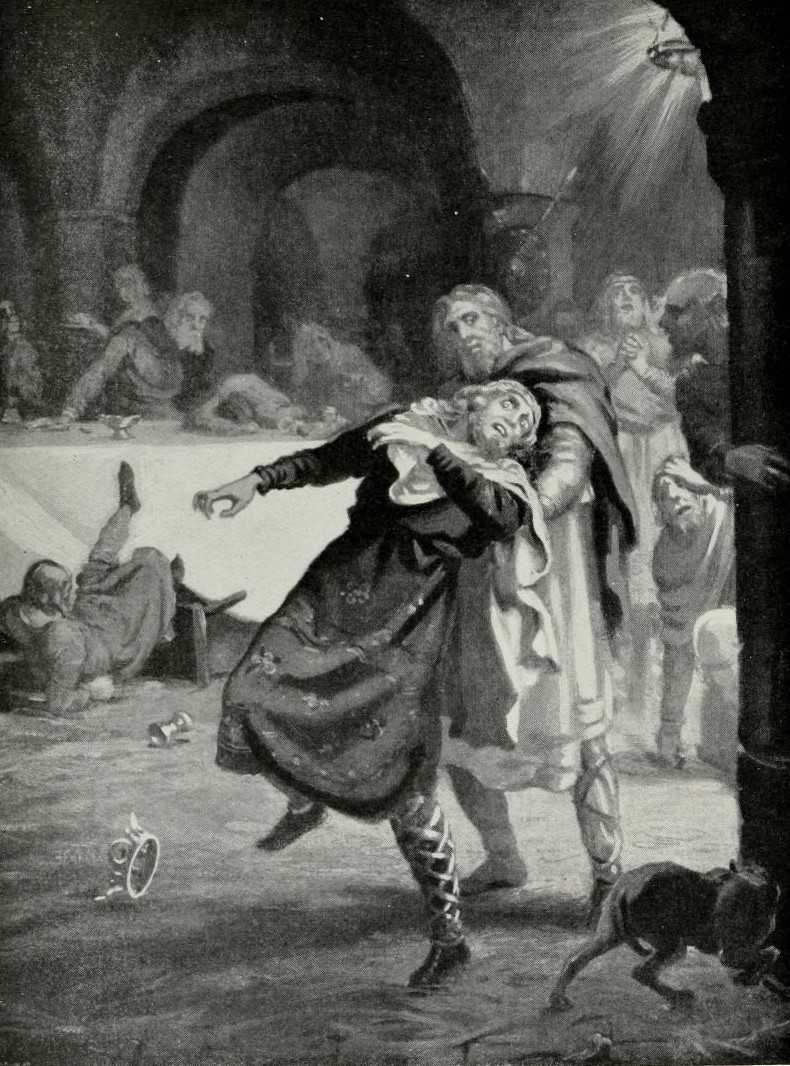
- Oil painting by Margaret Dovaston depicting Ceolred in a fit of madness

King of Mercia
- Reign: 709–716
- Predecessor: Coenred
- Successor: Æthelbald
- Died: 716 AD
- Burial: Lichfield Cathedral
- Spouse: Werburgh?
- Dynasty: Iclingas
- Father: Æthelred
- Mother: Osthryth?

Ceolred (died 716) was king of Mercia from 709 to 716.

== Mercia at the end of the 7th century ==
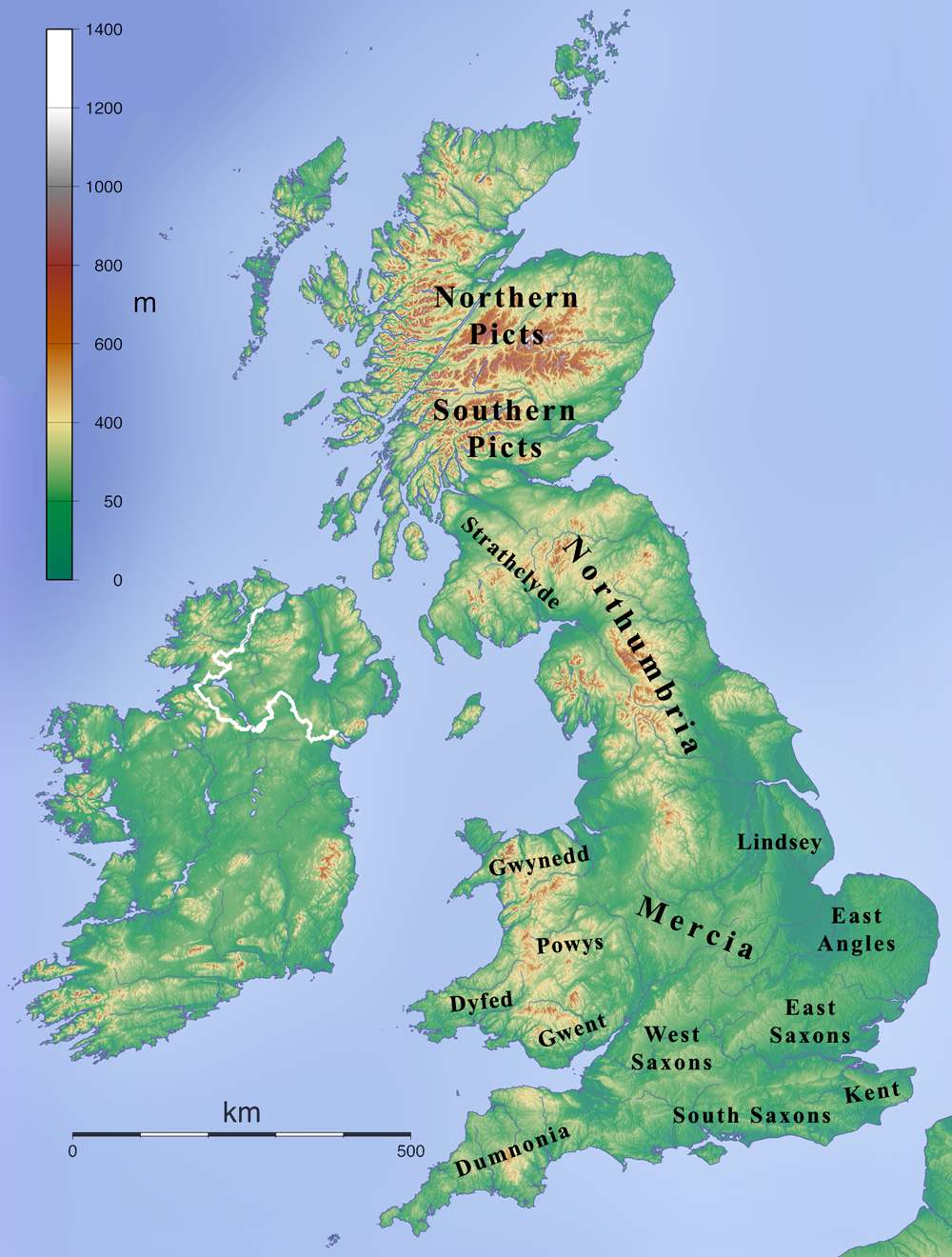
The kingdoms of Britain in the late 7th century

By the end of the 7th century, England was almost entirely divided into kingdoms ruled by the Anglo-Saxons, who had come to Britain two hundred years earlier. The kingdom of Mercia occupied what is now the English Midlands, bordered by Northumbria to the north, East Anglia to the east, and Wessex, the kingdom of the West Saxons, to the south. Essex, the kingdom of the East Saxons, included London and lay between East Anglia and the kingdom of Kent.

The main source for this period is Bede's Historia ecclesiastica gentis Anglorum (Ecclesiastical History of the English People), completed in about 731. Despite its focus on the history of the church, this work provides valuable information about the early Anglo-Saxon kingdoms. Bede had informants who supplied him with details of the church's history in Wessex and Kent, but he appears to have had no such contact in Mercia. Charters of Ceolred's, recording royal grants of land to individuals and to religious houses, also survive, as does the Anglo-Saxon Chronicle, compiled in Wessex at the end of the 9th century, but incorporating earlier material.

== Ancestry and reign ==
Ceolred's family tree

Ceolred's father, Æthelred, came to throne of Mercia in 675 on the death of his brother, Wulfhere. Æthelred abdicated in 704 and went to Rome, leaving the kingdom to his nephew Coenred, Wulfhere's son.

The reduced prestige of both Ceolred and his predecessor, Coenred, may have stirred unrest among the Mercian nobility: Æthelbald was in exile during Ceolred's reign, and the survival of a hostile account of Ceolred may indicate a more general dissatisfaction with the ruling line.

In 709 Coenred abdicated in favour of Ceolred. Coenred went to Rome and was made a monk there by Pope Constantine. Historians have generally accepted Bede's report of Coenred's abdication, but Barbara Yorke has suggested that he may not have relinquished his throne voluntarily. There are instances of kings being forcibly removed and placed in holy orders to make them ineligible for kingship; one such was King Osred II of Northumbria, who was forced into a monastery.

Ceolred was Æthelred's son, but his mother was not Osthryth, Æthelred's only recorded wife. He may have still been young at the time of his accession. Much of what is recorded about Ceolred is highly negative, accusing him of crimes and immorality; this may reflect poor treatment of the Church. In 715, the Mercians under Ceolred fought a battle at "Woden's Barrow", either against the West Saxons under Ine or together with them against an unnamed opponent, possibly the British; the outcome of this battle was not recorded.

== Charters ==
Ceolred confirmed a grant to Waldhere, the Bishop of London, evidence that London was firmly under Mercian overlordship. Later Mercian kings treated London as their direct possession, rather than as a province ruled by an underking, but Ceolred did not go that far. Three possibly genuine charters of Ceolred's have survived.

== Death and succession ==
In the next year, Ceolred died; Saint Boniface later described him as dying in a crazed frenzy at a banquet, "gibbering with demons and cursing the priests of God". Æthelbald, a member of another branch of the Mercian royal line who had been forced into exile during Ceolred's rule, succeeded him.

== Family ==
He was related to Coenred, the brother of Saint Werburgh of Mercia.
