= Cadwaladr ap Cadwallon =

King of Gwynedd (died 682)

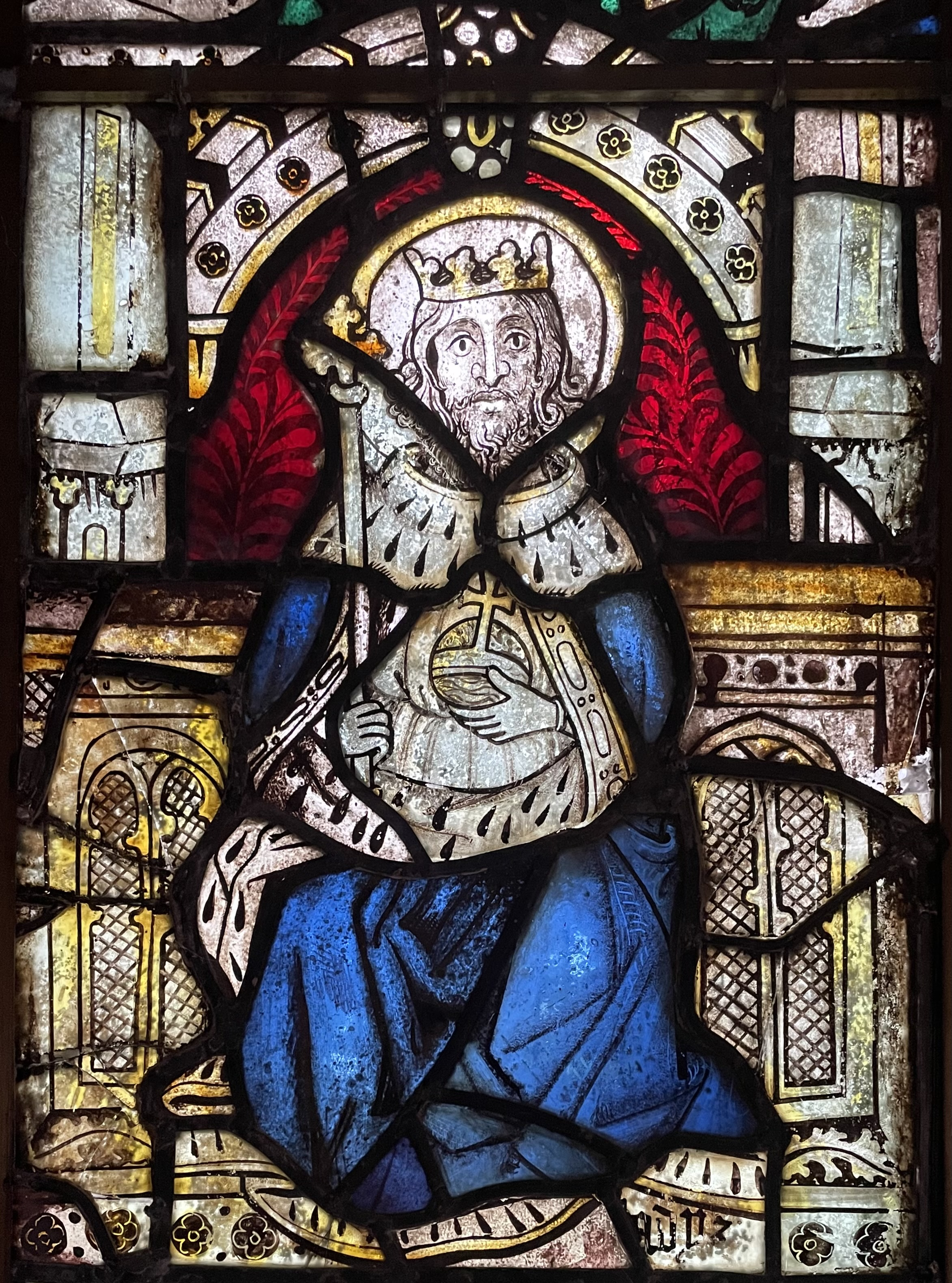
- Fifteenth-century stained glass depicting Cadwaladr in St Cadwaladr's Church, Llangadwaladr (Note: The inscription on the bottom right of the window reads [CADWA]LADYR. The pane to the left of this inscription, the ermine pane under Cadwaladr's right hand holding a sceptre, and Cadwaladr's face are nineteenth-century reconstructions. Cadwaladr is illustrated wearing parliament robes which bear a striking similarity to those of Henry VI of England.)

King of Gwynedd
- Reign: after 655 – 682
- Predecessor: Cadafael Cadomedd?
- Successor: Idwal Iwrch?
- Born: c. 633?
- Died: 682 (aged 48–49) (Note: Erroneously 20 April 689 in Geoffrey of Monmouth's De gestis Britonum and subsequently 20 April 682 in the Red Book of Hergest and Peniarth 20 versions of the Brut y Tywysogion.)
- Issue: Idwal Iwrch
- Dynasty: First Dynasty of Gwynedd
- Father: Cadwallon ap Cadfan
- Mother: a daughter of Pybba (spur.)

Cadwaladr ap Cadwallon (Note: Old Welsh: Catgualatr map Catgollaun, pronounced [kadɣu̯alˈadr mab kadɣu̯aɬˈau̯n]; Anglicised as Cadwalader or Cadwallader. Welsh ap means 'son of', and is used especially in genealogical contexts.) (died 682) or Cadwaladr Fendigaid (Note: Welsh: [kadˈwaladr vɛnˈdɪgai̯d], 'Cadwaladr the Blessed') was a late seventh-century king of Gwynedd. Little is known of his reign, but he later became a mythical redeemer figure in medieval Welsh literature following his depiction in the De gestis Britonum by Geoffrey of Monmouth. In Geoffrey's narrative, Cadwaladr was the last native Briton to be King of Britain, and renounced his throne in 689 to go on a pilgrimage to Rome after an angel prophesied to him that he must do so in order for the Welsh to eventually recover their patrimony. However, Geoffrey's account of Cadwaladr's sanctity and his visit to Rome is the result of an intentional or pre-existing conflation with events in the life of King Cædwalla of Wessex.

For later Welsh writers, the myth provided hope in a period when the native order was increasingly encroached upon by and subject to English authority and customs. Because of the popularity of Geoffrey's work in England, the legend was also used by the supporters of both Edward IV and Henry Tudor during the Wars of the Roses to claim that their candidate would fulfil the prophecy by restoring the authentic lineage of Cadwaladr to the throne of England. From the sixteenth century onwards, the Welsh Dragon has sometimes been conflated with Cadwaladr and referred to as "Red Dragon of Cadwalader" because of the importance of both Cadwaladr and the dragon in the ideology of Henry Tudor's supporters which helped to justify his claim to the throne.

In medieval Wales, Cadwaladr was also venerated as a saint, particularly at his dedicated church on Anglesey. The rediscovery of a tomb thought to be his at Saint Peter's Basilica in the late 1570s further fuelled a dispute between Welsh and English factions at the English College in Rome over the competing legacies of Cadwaladr and Cædwalla.

== Historical record ==
There are no contemporary records of Cadwaladr's reign, and the later ones which survive are confused and contradictory. Peter Bartrum suggested that he may have been born about 633 AD, shortly before his father's death at the Battle of Heavenfield. The earliest Welsh genealogies contained in the ninth-century manuscript Harley 3859 record him simply as Catguala[tr] map Catgollaun, and trace his ancestry as a member of the First Dynasty of Gwynedd back to Cunedda Wledig. (Note: MS Catgualart, an error for Catgualatr. See Guy 2020a, p. 334, n. 1. The full line, occurring in §1, the lineage of Owain ap Hywel Dda, is Catguala[tr] map Catgollaun map Catman map Iacob map Beli map Run map Mailcun map Catgolaun [L]auhir map Eniaun Girt map Cuneda map Ætern map Patern Pesrut map Tacit map Cein map Guorcein map Doli map Guordoli map Dumn map Guordumn map Amguoloyt map Amguerit map <Oumiud> map Dubun map Brithguein map Eugein map Aballac map Amalech, qui fuit Beli Magni filius et Anna mater eius, quam dicunt esse <consobrinam> Mariae uirginis matris Domini nostri Iesu Christi.)

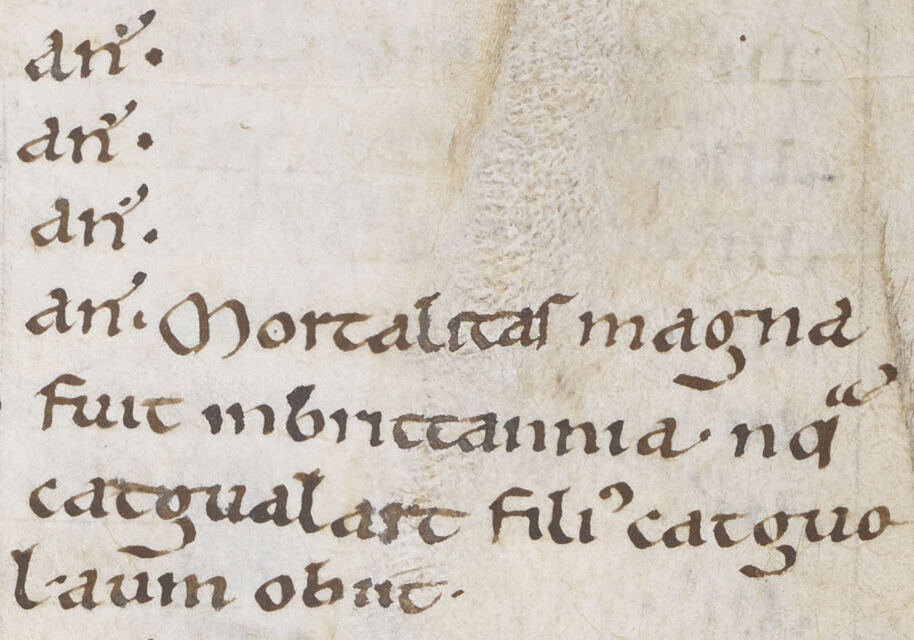
Cadwaladr's death in the Harley 3859 Welsh Annals, with a lack of absolute dates: Mortalitas magna fuit in Brittannia, in qua Catgualart filius Catguolaum obiit.

The earliest record of Cadwaladr's life is in the Historia Brittonum, written in 829 or 830 AD, but its depiction of Cadwaladr is not straightforward. In the section of the Historia Brittonum known as the "Northern History" because of its synchronisation of events with the reigns of kings of Northumbria, it is said that Cadwaladr reigned after his father Cadwallon ap Cadfan, who in 634 was slain while fighting against Oswald at Heavenfield, near Hadrian's Wall. The following section of the Historia Brittonum states that the king of Gwynedd in 655 was Cadafael ap Cynfeddw, an ally of Penda of Mercia whom he abandoned on the eve of the Battle of the Winwæd and thus earned the nickname Cadomedd, meaning 'Battle Dodger'. The Historia Brittonum also states that Cadwaladr died of plague in the reign of Oswiu. However, Oswiu died in 670, and an entry in the Welsh Annals records Cadwaladr's death as having occurred as a result of a plague in 682. This discrepancy arose because the author of the Historia Brittonum wrongly associated the plague in the Welsh Annals with the 664 plague in Bede's Ecclesiastical History. The author's confusion may have occurred because the Welsh Annals do not contain any absolute dates for their events but instead number its annals in groups of ten. Cadwaladr's reign is the last of a Welsh ruler in the Historia Brittonum, and this terminal position within such a widely disseminated text may have significantly influenced both his legacy and his portrayal in subsequent medieval literature. It is uncertain if Cadwaladr was succeeded by his son Idwal Iwrch. This near-total documentary silence left ample room for the elaborate literary tradition that later came to characterise Cadwaladr's memory.

== Cadwaladr and Geoffrey of Monmouth ==
A king called Cadualadrus is described as the final ruler of the Britons in Geoffrey of Monmouth's De gestis Britonum, a widely circulated fictional narrative of British history written between 1137 and 1139. Geoffrey drew on Welsh sources to fashion his narrative. However, his figure of Cadualadrus is an amalgam of the historical Cadwaladr and the Anglo-Saxon king Cædwalla, a late seventh-century ruler of the West Saxons.

=== Cadualadrus ===
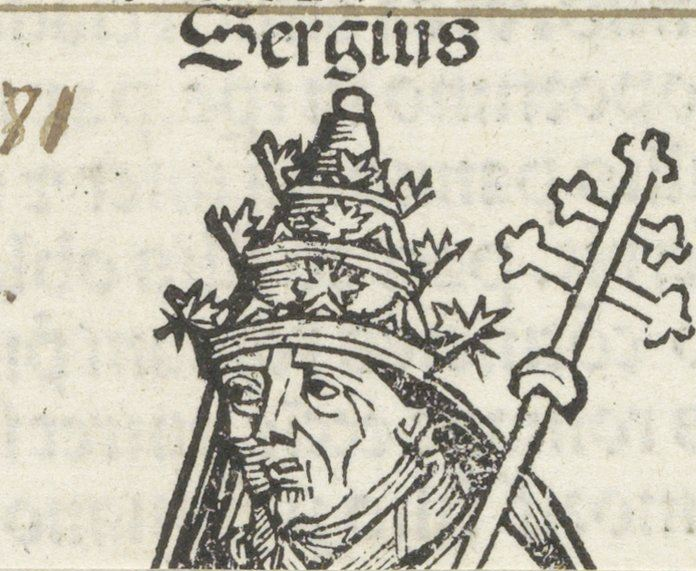
An illustration of Sergius in the Nuremburg Chronicle

In De gestis Britonum, Cadualadrus is said to have been the son of Caduallo, based on Cadwallon ap Cadfan, and a half-sister of Penda by a different mother but the same father. After a plague depopulates Britain, Cadualadrus leaves it for Brittany, and discerns that it is God's will that the sovereignty of Britain be taken from the British and given over to others. This plague completely depopulated Britain south of Scotland except for Cornwall and Wales, with the Anglo-Saxons settling the empty lands in what would become England. After the plague had passed, Cadualadrus prepared a fleet to recover Britain for the native Britons, but an angel appeared to Cadualadrus and told him that God would not allow them to rule over it until "the time came which Merlin had foretold to Arthur". Cadualadrus was also ordered by the angel to visit Pope Sergius in Rome, where after doing penance, his sainthood was assured. The angel further promised that sovereignty of the island would be returned to the Britons when Cadualadrus' body was returned to Britain from Rome sometime in the future. Cadualadrus' Breton host Alanus consulted written prophecies and urged Cadualadrus to fulfil the angel's words and go to Rome, where after taking monastic vows Cadualadrus died on 20 April 689.

Geoffrey obtained the story of Cadualadrus' pilgrimage and even his date of death from Bede's account of Cædwalla of the West Saxons, who actually died on 20 April 689 whilst on pilgrimage in Rome. As the year 689 would have been within the same group of ten years as the 682 entry in the Welsh Annals, Geoffrey would have faced the same difficulty as the author of the Historia Brittonum in dating Cadwaladr's death. If the merging of the two men did not predate De gestis Britonum, then Geoffrey seems, at minimum, to have elevated Cadwaladr's holiness, though he may even have reimagined a completely secular figure. This conflation between Cadwaladr and Cædwalla has been argued to predate Geoffrey's time. Any accidental confusion between the two prior to Geoffrey is highly unlikely, as it was Cadwaladr's father Cadwallon who bore a name equivalent to Cædwalla, not Cadwaladr himself. Instead, Geoffrey appears to have purposefully conflated the two and even borrowed the wording of Bede's introduction of Cædwalla in the Ecclesiastical History to introduce Cadualadrus in his De gestis Britonum. Both introduce their subjects as "of the race of the Gewisse", in Bede an archaic term for the royal dynasty of the West Saxons, but which denoted for Geoffrey the people of Gwent in south-east Wales. Geoffrey's assigning an English mother to Cadualadrus may have sought to reconcile the fact that Cædwalla is explicitly described as an English king in Bede. Geoffrey's citation of Bede in his introduction of Cadualadrus may even imply that he thought that Bede misidentified Cædwalla, and left it to the reader to decide which account to believe.

=== The Vita Merlini and Armes Prydein ===
In 1150, Geoffrey of Monmouth completed the Vita Merlini, a poem narrating how Merlin went mad after a battle and thereafter dwelt in woods, prophesying the future. Geoffrey's Merlin foretells the restoration of Britain to the native Britons, and mentions Cadwaladr by name as one of the two leaders who will enact these events:

Set non perficient quia sic sententia summi judicis existit, Britones ut nobile regnum temporibus multis amittant debilitate, donec ab Armorica veniet temone Conanus et Cadualadrus Cambrorum dux venerandus, qui pariter Scotos Cambras et Comubienses Armoricosque viros sociabunt federe firmo amissumque suis reddent diadema colonis, hostibus expulsis renovato tempore Bruti, tractabuntque suas sacratis legibus urbes.

— Geoffrey of Monmouth, Vita Merlini, lines 964–973
Translation:

It is the will of the most high Judge that the British shall be without their kingdom for many years and remain weak, until Conan in his chariot arrive from Brittany, and that revered leader of the Welsh, Cadwalader. ‘They will create an alliance, a firm league of the Scots, the Welsh, the Cornish and the men of Brittany. Then they will restore to the natives the crown that had been lost. The enemy will be driven out and the time of Brutus will be back once more.

— Translation by Basil Clarke

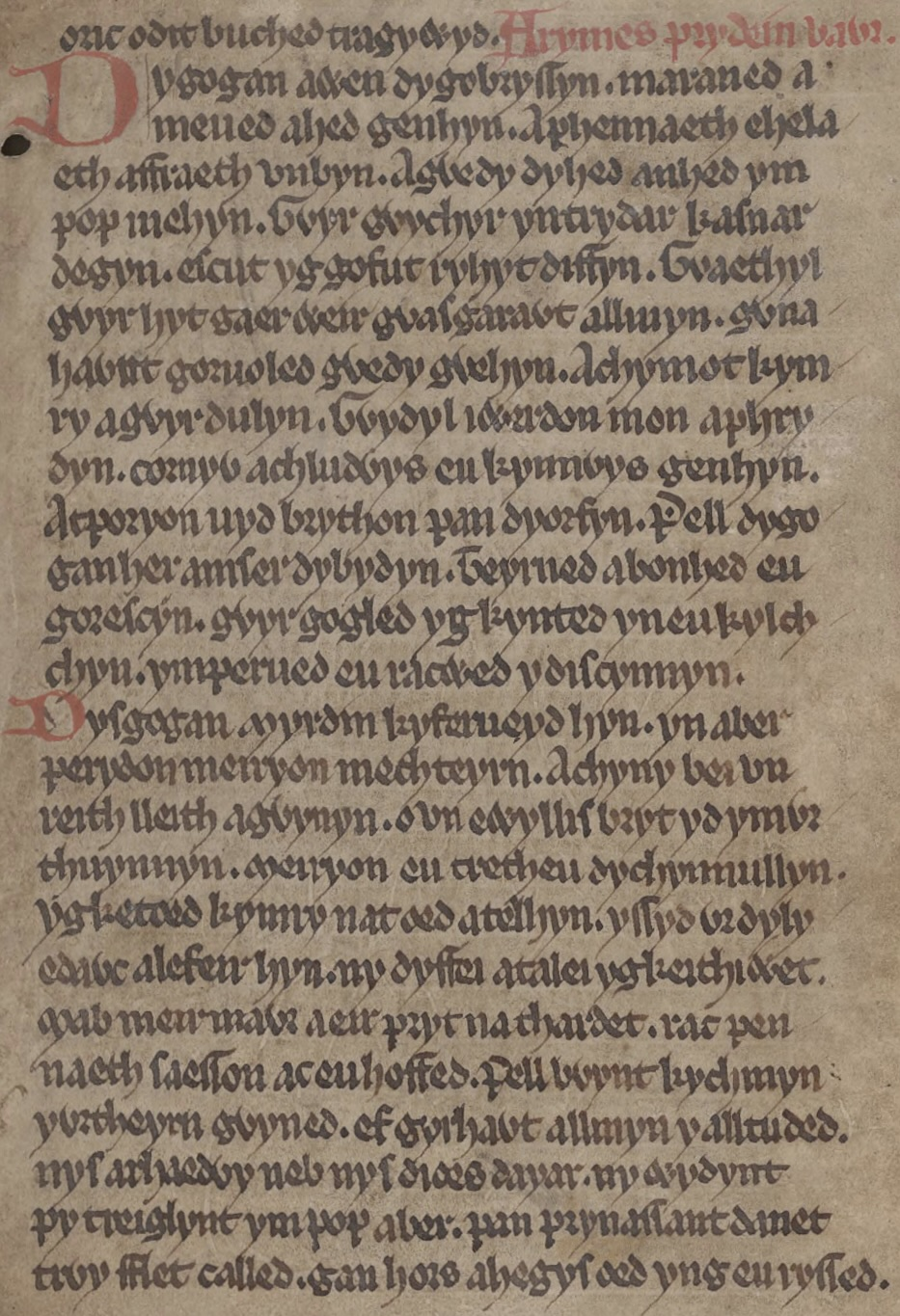
Peniarth MS 2, folio 6r: the beginning of Armes Prydein

Geoffrey was not the first to narrate such a restoration, as his narrative bears a striking similarity to that contained in Armes Prydein Vawr, a tenth-century political prophecy surviving in a fourteenth-century manuscript. Geoffrey almost certainly had read a version of Armes Prydein or a poem like it prior to his composition of Vita Merlini. In Armes Prydein, two heroes are named as Cadwaladr and Cynan, future leaders who will lead an alliance of the Britons or Kymry, Irish, Scots, and Hiberno-Scandinavians in order to drive the Anglo-Saxons out of Britain and return the island to British control. Geoffrey's preoccupation with legitimacy is parallelled in Armes Prydein, as its poet asserts that the English settlement of Britain is illegitimate because of its coming into existence through the actions of Hengist and Horsa. The poem also voices a grievance over the current desire for extortionate tribute from the Welsh by a figure known as the mechteyrn, meaning 'Great King', generally identified as Æthelstan or Edmund I. In the poem, the assembled armies of the Kymry are even envisioned as querying the English in the midst of battle as to their right to be in Britain at all. (Note: Gofynnant yr Saesson py geissyssant. pwy meint eu dylyet or wlat a dalyant. cw mae eu herw pan seilyassant. cw mae eu kenedloed py vro pan doethant. — Armes Prydein, lines 133–136 Translation: They will ask the English for what they have sought, How much of the land they hold [according to] their right? Where is their land whence they set out? Where are their peoples, from what region did they come? — Translation by Rebecca Thomas) For the poet, the Cornish and the men of Strathclyde were distinct from the Kymry, though they would be reconciled as one people in the future. Cadwaladr is mentioned three times in the poem, while Cynan appears twice; the two are named together on three occasions. Cadwaladr and Cynan are not explicitly associated with any identifiable figures within the text of Armes Prydein, and the Vita Merlini is the earliest extant text to make a clear identification of these individuals as Cadwaladr ap Cadwallon of Gwynedd and Cynan Meiriadog, the latter regarded by Geoffrey as the founder of Brittany. Geoffrey also alluded to this prophecy in the De gestis Brittonum, but he did not there identify Cadualadrus or Conanus. Cadwaladr ap Cadwallon may already have been identified as a future deliverer of the Welsh before Geoffrey's time given his prominent concluding role in the Historia Brittonum, but it remains unclear how the Welsh themselves understood the historical importance of Cadwaladr's reign prior to Geoffrey's account.

=== Welsh reception of Cadualadrus ===
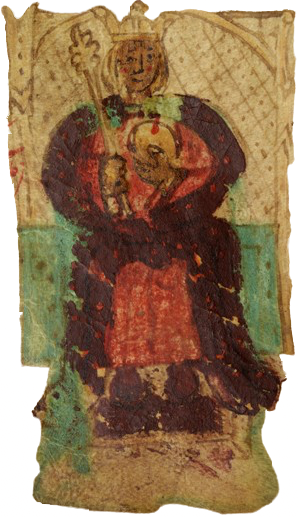
An illumination of Cadwaladr in the Peniarth 23 Brut

The medieval Welsh imported Geoffrey's depiction of Cadualadrus wholesale into their own representations of the monarch. The popularity of Geoffrey's work led to multiple translations of De gestis Britonum into Welsh. These are not always strict translations, as some versions elaborate on Cadwaladr's supposed Gwentian ancestry by saying his mother was of the aristocracy of Ergyng and Ewias. Geoffrey's legacy was also felt in more strictly historic writings: the Brut y Tywysogion begins in 682 AD with the death of Cadwaladr, but this is located in Rome and dated to 20 April, as in Geoffrey.

Cadwaladr features most prominently in Middle Welsh prophecy. He is a central figure in the prophecies attributed to the early Welsh poet Taliesin, occurring in four of the ten prophecies to which Taliesin's name is affixed, where he is said to be a future deliverer of the Welsh, as in Armes Prydein. Cadwaladr also appears in some of the poetry attributed to the prophet Myrddin. According to some of these poems, Cadwaladr will meet with Cynan at the unidentified Rhyd Rheon before beginning their conquest. The combined testimony of these prophecies suggests that Cadwaladr would have first conquered North Wales, while Cynan would campaign from the south, and the two combined would then together defeat the English. Cadwaladr appears to always have had a more prominent position in these prophecies than Cynan.

== Veneration ==
Saint Cadwaladr Fendigaid
- Venerated in: Medieval Wales
- Canonized: Never officially (Folk saint)
- Major shrine: St Cadwaladr's, Llangadwaladr
- Feast: 12 November

In the Middle Ages, Cadwaladr was considered to be a saint in Wales, and is recorded as the last of the royal saints of the First Dynasty of Gwynedd in the Bonedd y Saint, a medieval collection of the genealogies of the native saints of Wales. Genealogies of Cadwaladr shortly after the publication of De gestis Britonum give him a sobriquet, with the genealogy of Gruffudd ap Cynan in the twelfth-century Vita Griffini filii Conani calling him Cadwaleder[us] Benedict[us], (Note: Cadwaleder[us] Benedict[us], filii Cadwallawn manus oblongae, filii Einawn Yrth, filii Cunedae regis, filii Ederni, filii Paterni vestis ceruleae, filii Tageti, filii Jacobi, filii Guidawc, filii Keni, fili Caini, filii Gorgaini, filii Doli, filii Gurdoli, filii Dwvyn, filii Gordwvyn, filii Anwerit, fili Onnet, filii Diawng, filii Brychweni, filii Yweni, filii Avallach, filii Avlech, filii Beli Magni.) and the Llywelyn ab Iorwerth Genealogies referring to Cadwaladr as Kadwaladyr Vendigait. (Note: Katwaladyr Vendigait ap Katwallawn ap Katfan ap Iago ap Beli ap Run ap Maelgwn Gwyned ap <Katwallawn> <Lawhir> ap Eynion Yrth ap Kuneda Wledig ap Edern ap Padarn Peisrud ap Tagit ap Iago ap <Genedawg> ap Kein ap Gorgain ap Doli ap Gwrdoli ap Dwfyn ap Gordwfyn ap Amweryd ap Onwed ap Dywng ap Brychwein ap Ywein m. Afallach m. Aflech m. Beli Mawr m. Menogan m. Eneid m. Kerwyt m. Krydon m. <Dyfnarch> m. Prydein m. Aed Mawr m. <Antonius> m. Seirioel m. Gwrwst m. Riwallawn m. Kuneda m. Regau ferch Lyr m. <Bleidyd> m. Run Baladyr Bras m. Lleon m. Brutus Ysgwythir m. Efrawg m. Mymbyr m. Madawg m. <Lokrinus> m. Brutus twyssawg Rufain, y brenhin kyntaf a dyfu y'r ynys honn, ag o'e henw a elwir Ynys Brydein, ag en y bedwared oes o’r byt y <dyvv> y’r ynys honn. Brutus m. Sil m. <Askanius> m. Eneas Ysgwydwyn m. Enchises m. Kapis m. <Assarakus> m. Tros m. <Eriktonius> m. <Dardanus> m. Iubiter m. Sadwrn m. Silius m. <Kretus> m. <Ciprius> m. <Cetim> m. Iauan m. Iaffeth m. Noe Hen m. Lamech m. <Matusale> m. Ennoc m. Iareth m. Malaleel m. Kaynan mab Enos m. Seth m. Adaf.) Both nicknames mean 'Blessed Cadwaladr', and they may reflect the legendary sanctity of Geoffrey's Cadualadrus. Cadwaladr is also called 'Blessed' in the Brut y Brenhinedd, but this appellation is absent in the original Latin of Geoffrey's work.

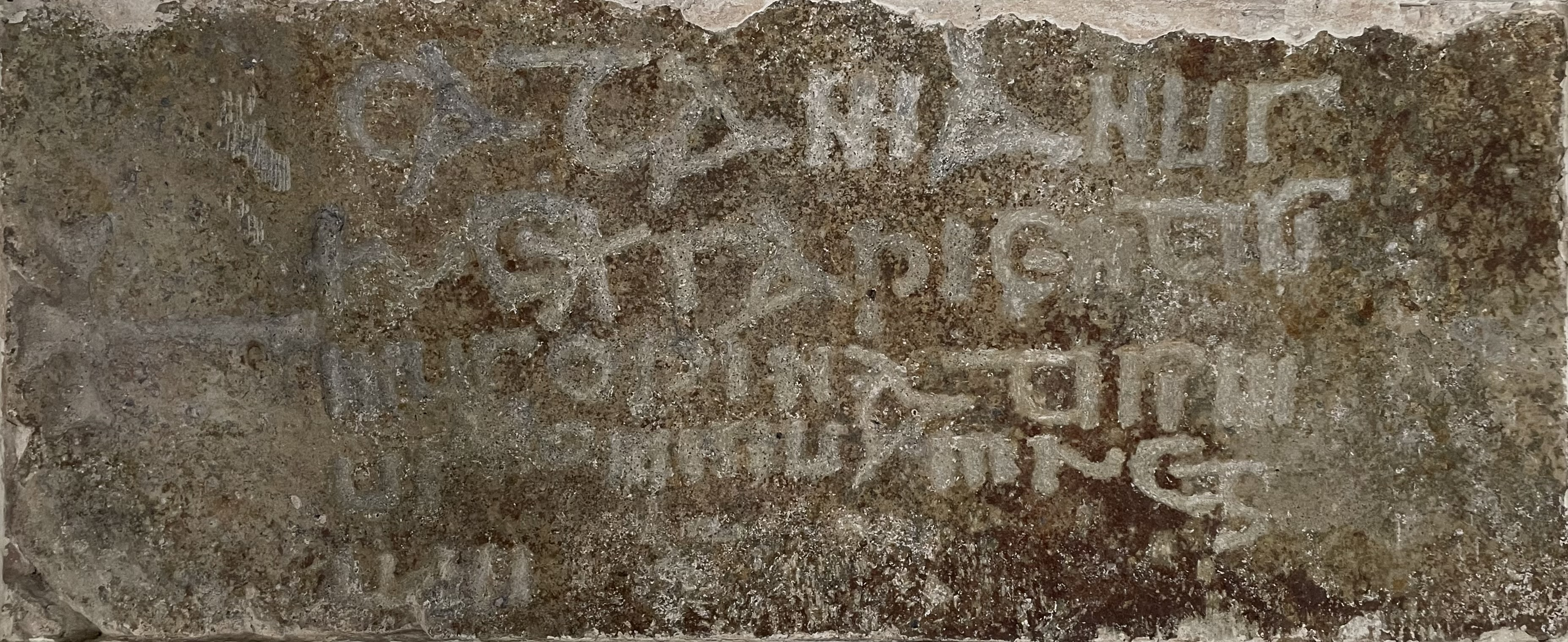
The Catamanus stone: CATAMANUS REX SAPIENTISIMUS OPINATISIMUS OMNIUM REGUM 'King Catamanus, the wisest, most illustrious of all kings'

According to Barry Lewis, the most recent editor of Bonedd y Saint, "[i]t cannot be ruled out that Cadwaladr only became accepted as a saint after he acquired Cædwalla's role as a penitent monk in Rome." However, the church of Llangadwaladr in Anglesey, dedicated to and named for Cadwaladr, is generally understood to have been an early medieval foundation. The earliest record of this parish is in the 1352 Extent of Anglesey, where it is called 'Eglwys Ail', and was "free and... held of St. Cadwaladr the King." The early importance of Llangadwaladr may be evidenced by its closeness to Aberffraw, symbolic seat of the kings of Gwynedd, as the other royal centres of medieval Wales were also situated near important religious sites. An early date for this foundation may be suggested by the presence of a certain stone built into the interior wall of the church which memorialises Cadwaladr's grandfather, Cadfan ab Iago. Thomas Charles-Edwards has argued that it was raised shortly after Cadfan's death in the mid-620s on the orders of Cadwaladr's father, Cadwallon. Barry Lewis therefore proposed that Cadwaladr may have founded the church as a lay patron, and only later became accepted as a saint and dedicatee, perhaps after the publication of Geoffrey of Monmouth's works. The possibility remains that the memory of Cadwaladr's association with the foundation may have encouraged an earlier cult of the king on the site. Nevertheless, according to Lewis this "must remain speculative in the absence of decisive early medieval evidence".

A number of later medieval manuscripts of the fifteenth and sixteenth centuries record Cadwaladr's feast day as 12 November. A marginal note in a sixteenth-century manuscript to a poem by Rhys Goch Glyndyfrdwy to the imprisoned sons of a Lancastrian nobleman in the Lordship of Chirk confirms this date, saying that the brothers were jail on "Friday, the feast of Cadwaladr, on the twelfth day of winter."

== Legacy ==
=== Cadwaladr and the Wars of the Roses ===
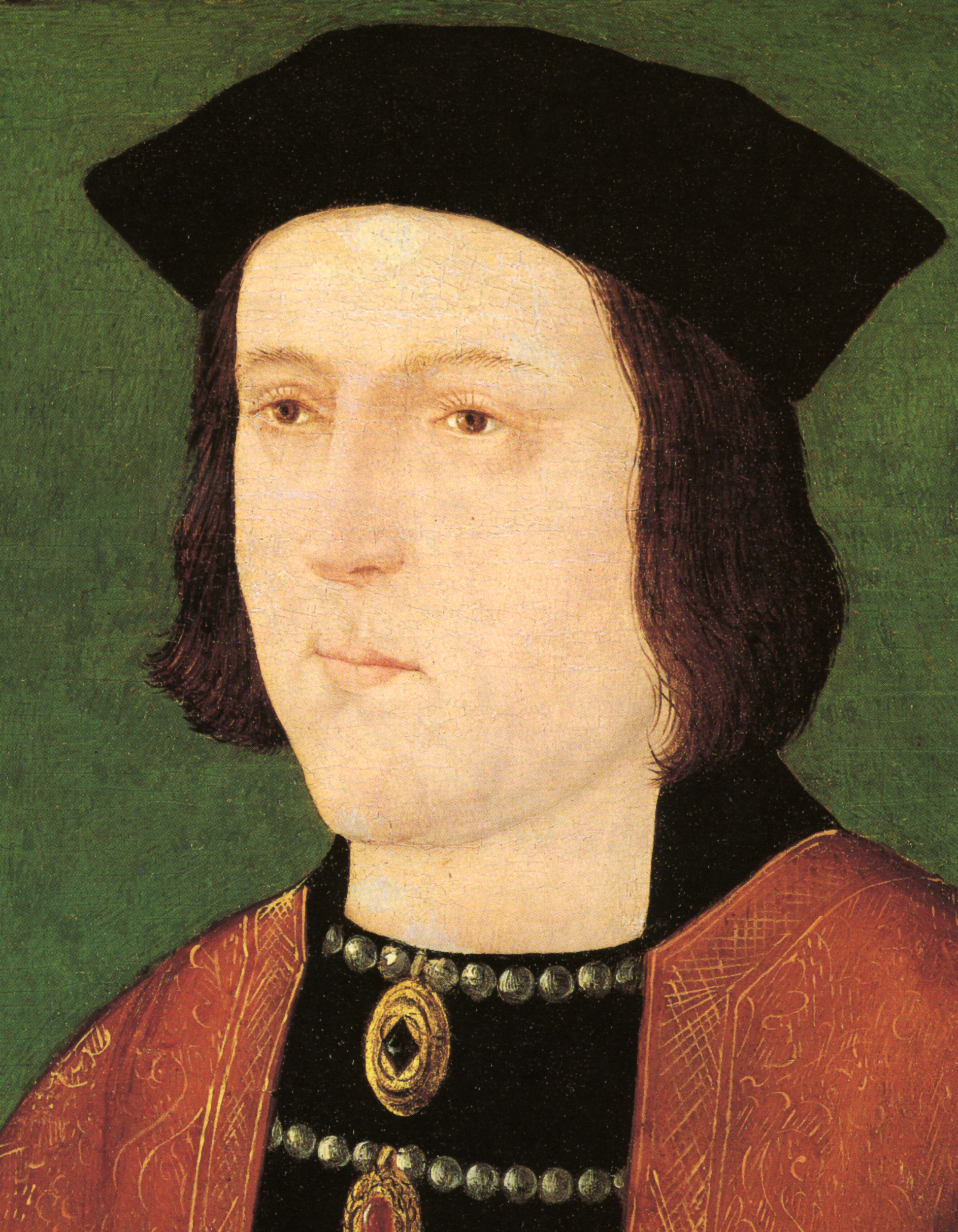
Edward IV of England, who identified himself with Cadwaladr

This prophetic tradition had clear political currency well before the Wars of the Roses: Owain Glyndŵr put forward his claim to be Prince of Wales based on his descent from Cadwaladr in a letter to Robert III of Scotland of November 1401. The popularity of Geoffrey of Monmouth's work was not restricted to Wales, however, and its depiction of Cadwaladr went on to influence political propaganda during the fifteenth-century Wars of the Roses, when descendants of Edward III of England fought one another for control of the kingdom. The Yorkist king Edward IV was the first to emphasise his genealogical descent from Cadwaladr, which was traced through his grandmother, Anne Mortimer, who descended from Gwladys Ddu, the daughter of Llywelyn ab Iorwerth, thirteenth-century king of Gwynedd and member of the Second Dynasty of Gwynedd, thereby establishing a line of descent from Cadwaladr. One surviving manuscript stressing Edward's descent from Iorwerth Drwyndwn says that Edward was verus heres Cadwalladro qui vocatur Rubeus Draco 'a true heir to Cadwaladr, who is called the Red Dragon'. This recalls the prophecy of Ambrosius in the Historia Brittonum and that of Merlin in Geoffrey of Monmouth's work, in which the struggle between the Britons and the English for Britain is embodied by a red and white dragon fighting under the foundation of a castle which Vortigern wished to construct. In another genealogical roll, Edward's descent from the royal houses of England and France is denoted by a white dragon on one side of a manuscript, while his descent from Cadwaladr is denoted by a red dragon on the other. This descent was joined in Edwards' propaganda with alchemical explanations which sought to stress how he would become a unifying figure whose reign would lead to a rebirth of Britain, which had been wracked by civil war for years.

Edward IV was raised in the Marches, and enjoyed support in Wales. Edward was even identified as Cadwaladr in some Yorkist prophecies. The poet Guto'r Glyn was an enthusiastic supporter of Edward, and stressed his descent from Cadwaladr through Gwladys Ddu and his identity as the Red Dragon in a poem from the 1460s addressing the king and entreating him to rectify problems in Wales.

The Lancastrian Henry Tudor, who reigned as Henry VII after the Battle of Bosworth in 1485, also sought to legitimise his rule by stressing his descent from Cadwaladr, though he appears to have done so with less interest than Edward IV. Like Edward, Henry Tudor was descended from Cadwaladr, in this case through the marriage of his ancestor Ednyfed Fychan with Gwenllian, a daughter of the Lord Rhys of Deheubarth, as the House of Deheubarth was a cadet branch of the Second Dynasty of Gwynedd. Henry Tudor's Welsh supporters stressed his descent from Cadwaladr, and a poem by Lewys Glyn Cothi in praise of Henry says "Y deyrnas isod drwy enw Siesus / sy i'r Cing Harri, rhyswr cynghorus; / oddyna i dwy'r ddawnus – frenhiniaeth / y ceidw lywodraeth Cadwaladrus" 'By the name of Jesus, the kingdom belongs to King Henry, a wise champion; thence will it come to pass by his wise rule that he will keep up the government of Cadwaladr.' Another anonymous Welsh poem exhorts Henry and mentions Cadwaladr by name: Deigr Cadwaladr fendigaid, / Dyred a dwg dir dy daid. / Dyga ran dy garennydd, / Dwg ni o'n rhwym dygn yn rhydd. 'Tear of Cadwaladr Fendigaid, come and take the land of your grandfather. Take your kinsmen's portion, make us free from our severe bondage.' However, genealogies from later in Henry's reign and after the birth of Prince Arthur do not show such an interest in the family's Welsh descent, and one even traced Arthur's "British" heritage through Elizabeth of York, Edward IV's daughter.

Henry Tudor flew a standard which bore a red dragon at the Battle of Bosworth. While this dragon is later referred to as the "Red Dragon of Cadwalader", this name never occurs in fifteenth-century armorials, and when copies were ordered of Cadwaladr's attributed arms following the battle, the dragon and the arms appear to have been seen as separate items. Nevertheless, from the early sixteenth century a connection is made between Cadwaladr and the dragon, where the arms of Cadwaladr are commonly supported by a red dragon with wings expanded.

=== Cadwaladr and the Seminarium Britannicum ===
Geoffrey of Monmouth's works were largely seen as historical until the dismantlement of Geoffrey's narrative in the early sixteenth century by the Italian historian Polydore Vergil. Vergil's supporters and critics debated one another in the background of the English Reformation and the Reformation more generally, which led to an exodus of recusant exiles to the English Hospice in Rome. Despite the name, the English Hospice was headed by Welshmen from 1565 to 1579 and during this period disproportionately supported Welsh students. The Hospice was refounded as a seminary by the Welshmen Morys Clynnog and Owen Lewis in 1578, who preferred to call the seminary the Seminarium Britannicum, or 'British College'. Their preferential treatment of Welsh students over the more numerous English led to internal divisions which were only exacerbated by the discovery of the supposed bones of Cædwalla or Cadwaladr whilst Saint Peter's Basilica was undergoing renovation in the late 1570s. The Welsh students at the college immediately recognised the significance of this discovery, and sought to claim the bones as the first step of the fulfilment of Merlin's prophecies according to Geoffrey of Monmouth. Eventually, the English students successfully convinced the Vatican authorities of the falsehood of Geoffrey's account and argued on Bede's authority that the bones belonged to Cædwalla. The fallout from this dispute would have lasting effects on the seminary, as on April 23, 1579, Pope Gregory XIII formally established the English College, with Clynnog and Lewis leaving the college shortly thereafter.

== Arms ==
Coat of arms of Cadwaladr ap Cadwallon
Notes Attributed arms, not attested before the sixteenth century. Escutcheon Azure, a cross patty fitchy Or. Supporters These arms are painted in a number of early sixteenth-century manuscripts on a banner held by a winged red dragon.

== Works cited ==
=== Primary sources ===
- Bartrum, P. C., ed. (1974). Welsh Genealogies: AD 300–1400. Cardiff: University of Wales Press. doi:10.20391/40837b6f-1887-4afd-9c6e-9b7e3a122693. ISBN 070830561X. Archived from the original on 6 June 2023.
- Bromwich, Rachel, ed. (2014). Trioedd Ynys Prydein: The Triads of the Island of Britain (4th ed.). Cardiff: University of Wales Press. ISBN 9781783161454.
- Carr, A. D. (1972). "The Extent of Anglesey 1352". Transactions of the Anglesey Antiquarian Society and Field Club. Anglesey Antiquarian Society and Field Club: 150–172.
- Clarke, Basil, ed. (1973). Geoffrey of Monmouth — Life of Merlin: Vita Merlini. ISBN 9780847662647.
- Colgrave, Bertram; Mynors, R. A. B., eds. (1969). Bede's Ecclesiastical History of the English People. Oxford: Clarendon Press. IA x-bede-s-ecclesiastical-history.
- Guy, Ben, ed. (2020a). Medieval Welsh Genealogy: an Introduction and Textual Study. Woodbridge: Boydell Press. ISBN 9781783275137.
  ——, ed. (2025a). "Yr Afallennau". An Edition of the Welsh Merlin Poetry. Swansea: Swansea University. Archived from the original on 7 April 2026.
  ——, ed. (2025b). "Cyfoesi Myrddin a Gwenddydd ei Chwaer". An Edition of the Welsh Merlin Poetry. Swansea: Swansea University. Archived from the original on 26 October 2025.
- Haycock, Marged, ed. (2013). Prophecies from the Book of Taleisin. Aberystwyth: CMCS Publications. ISBN 9780955718274.
- Hopwood, Llewelyn, ed. (2025). "Yr Oianau". An Edition of the Welsh Merlin Poetry. Swansea: Swansea University. Archived from the original on 7 April 2026.
- Johnston, Dafydd, ed. (1995). Gwaith Lewys Glyn Cothi (in Welsh). Cardiff: University of Wales Press.
- Jones, Owen; Williams, Edward; Owen Pughe, William, eds. (1870). "Brut Tysilio". The Myvyrian Archaiology of Wales: Collected out of Ancient Manuscripts (in Middle Welsh). Vol. 1. Denbigh: Thomas Gee. pp. 434–475. IA myvyrianarchaiol00jone.
- Jones, Thomas, ed. (1952). Brut y Tywysogion: or, The Chronicle of the Princes: Peniarth MS 20 Version. Cardiff: University of Wales Press.
  ——, ed. (1955). Brut y Tywysogion: or, The Chronicle of the Princes: Red Book of Hergest Version. Cardiff: University of Wales Press. IA isbn_0708301045.
- Lewis, Henry, ed. (1942). Brut Dingestow (in Welsh). Cardiff: University of Wales Press. IA brutdingestow0000unse.
- Lewis, Barry J., ed. (2013). "Annog Edward IV i adfer trefn yng Nghymru". Guto'r Glyn.net. Swansea: Swansea University. Archived from the original on 19 June 2015.
- Lewis, Barry, ed. (2023). Bonedd y Saint: An edition and study of the genealogies of the Welsh saints. Dublin: Dublin Institute of Advanced Studies. ISBN 9781855002517.
- Morris, John, ed. (1980). Nennius: British History and The Welsh Annals. London: Phillimore. ISBN 9780847662647. IA britishhistorywe0000unse.
- Parry, John Jay, ed. (1937). Brut y Brenhinedd: Cotton Cleopatra Version. Cambridge: Mediaeval Academy of America.
- Parry Owen, Ann, ed. (2013). "I gymodi ag Ieuan Fychan ab Ieuan o Bengwern". Guto'r Glyn.net. Swansea: Swansea University. Archived from the original on 6 December 2025.
- Reeve, Michael D., ed. (2007). Geoffrey of Monmouth — The History of the Kings of Britain: an Edition and Translation of De gestis Britonum [Historia Regum Britanniae]. Translated by Wright, Neil. Woodbridge: The Boydell Press. ISBN 9781843832065.
- Russell, Paul, ed. (2005). Vita Griffini Filii Conani: the Medieval Life of Gruffudd ap Cynan. Cardiff: University of Wales Press. ISBN 9780708318935.
- Rhŷs, John; Evans, J. G., eds. (1890). "Ystorya Brenhined y Brytanyeit". The Text of the Bruts from the Red Book of Hergest (in Middle Welsh). Oxford: J. G. Evans. pp. 40–256. IA textofbrutsfromr00rhys.
- Williams, Ifor, ed. (1972). Armes Prydein: The Prophecy of Britain, From the Book of Taliesin. Translated by Bromwich, Rachel. Dublin: Dublin Institute for Advanced Studies. ISBN 9780901282569. IA bwb_KV-543-772.

=== Secondary sources ===
- Anglo, Sydney (1961). "The British History in early Tudor propaganda: with an appendix of manuscript pedigrees of the Kings of England, Henry VI to Henry VIII". Bulletin of the John Rylands Library. 5. Manchester University Press: 17–41. doi:10.7227/bjrl.44.1.2.
- Baring-Gould, Sabine, ed. (1908). The lives of the British Saints: the Saints of Wales and Cornwall and such Irish Saints as have dedications in Britain. Vol. II. London: Charles J. Clark. IA livesofbritishsa02bariuoft.
- Breeze, Andrew (1997). "Armes Prydein, Hywel Dda, and the reign of Edmund of Wessex". Études Celtiques. 33. CRNS Editions: 209–222. doi:10.3406/ecelt.1997.2119.
- Charles-Edwards, Thomas (1995). "Language and Society among the Insular Celts AD 400–1000". In Aldhouse-Green, Miranda (ed.). The Celtic World. London: Routledge. pp. 703–736. doi:10.4324/9780203713792. ISBN 9780203713792. IA celticworld0000unse.
  —— (2013). Wales and the Britons, 350-1064. Oxford: Oxford University Press. ISBN 9780198217312. IA walesbritons35010000char.
- Dumville, David (1976a). "The Anglian collection of royal genealogies and regnal lists". Anglo-Saxon England. 5. Cambridge University Press: 23–50. JSTOR 44510666.
  —— (1976b). "On the North British Section of the Historia Brittonum". Welsh History Review. 8. University of Wales Press: 345–354.
  —— (1983). "Brittany and Armes Prydein Vawr". Études Celtiques. 20. CNRS Editions: 145–159. doi:10.3406/ecelt.1983.1736.
- Edwards, Nancy, ed. (2013). A Corpus of Early Medieval Inscribed Stones and Stone Sculpture in Wales. Vol. III: North Wales. Cardiff: University of Wales Press.
- Griffiths, Margaret Enid (1937). Jones, T. Gwynn (ed.). Early Vaticination in Welsh with English Parallels. Cardiff: University of Wales Press.
- Guy, Ben (2020b). "Geoffrey of Monmouth's Welsh Sources". In Henley, Georgia; Smith, Joshua Byron (eds.). A Companion to Geoffrey of Monmouth. Leiden: Brill. pp. 31–67. doi:10.1163/9789004410398_003. ISBN 9789004410398.
- Henken, Elissa R. (1996). National Redeemer: Owain Glyndŵr in Welsh tradition. Ithaca: Cornell University Press. ISBN 0801432685. IA nationalredeemer00henk.
- Hughes, Jonathan (2002). Arthurian Myths and Alchemy: the Kingship of Edward IV. Thrupp: Sutton Press. ISBN 0750919949.
- Jackson, Kenneth (1963). "On the Northern British Section in Nennius". In Chadwick, Nora K. (ed.). Celt and Saxon: Studies in the Early British Border. Cambridge: Cambridge University Press. pp. 20–63. IA celtsaxonstudies0000unse.
- Kendrick, T. D. (1950). British Antiquity. London: Methuen & Co. IA in.gov.ignca.10035.
- Lewis, Barry (2020). "Religion and the Church in Geoffrey of Monmouth". In Henley, Georgia; Smith, Joshua Byron (eds.). A Companion to Geoffrey of Monmouth. Leiden: Brill. pp. 397–424. doi:10.1163/9789004410398_016. ISBN 9789004410398.
- Lloyd, J. E. (1912). A History of Wales from the Earliest Times to the Edwardian Conquest. Vol. 1. London: Longmans, Green, & Co. IA 2edhistoryofwale01lloyuoft.
  —— (1931). Owen Glendower: Owen Glyn Dŵr. Oxford: Clarendon Press. IA owenglendowerowe0000jell.
  —— (1959). "CADWALADR (died 664), prince". Dictionary of Welsh Biography. Aberystwyth: National Library of Wales.
- McBride, David; Giusteri, Pietro C. M. (2023). "George Lily, Ignazio Danti and Evolving Perceptions of Wales in Early Modern Italy". Studia Celtica. 57. University of Wales Press: 113–130. doi:10.16922/sc.57.6.
- Millican, Charles Bowie, ed. (1932). Spenser and the Table Round: A Study in the Contemporaneous Background for Spenser's Use of the Arthurian Legend. Cambridge: Harvard University Press. IA spenserroundtabl0008char.
- Nice, Jason A. (2006). "Being "British" in Rome: the Welsh at the English College, 1578–1584". The Catholic Historical Review. 92 (1). Catholic University of America Press: 1–24. JSTOR 25027010.
- Pryce, Huw (1995). "Mathrafal: the Evidence of the Written Sources". Montgomeryshire Collections. 83. Powysland Club: 61–65. hdl:10107/1271286.
- Roberts, Brynley F. (2008). "Geoffrey of Monmouth, Historia Regum Britanniae, and Brut y Brenhinedd". In Bromwich, Rachel; Jarman, A. O. H.; Roberts, Brynley F. (eds.). The Arthur of the Welsh: the Arthurian Legend in Medieval Welsh Literature (Second ed.). Cardiff: University of Wales Press. pp. 97–116.
- Siddons, Michael Powell (1993). The Development of Welsh Heraldry. Vol. 2. Aberystwyth: National Library of Wales. ISBN 090715851X.
- Smith, Joshua Byron (2020). "Introduction and Biography". In Henley, Georgia; Smith, Joshua Byron (eds.). A Companion to Geoffrey of Monmouth. Leiden: Brill. pp. 1–28. doi:10.1163/9789004410398_002. ISBN 9789004410398.
- Tahkokallio, Jaakko (2020). "Early Manuscript Dissemination". In Henley, Georgia; Smith, Joshua Byron (eds.). A Companion to Geoffrey of Monmouth. Leiden: Brill. pp. 155–180. doi:10.1163/9789004410398_007. ISBN 9789004410398.
- Thomas, R. J.; Bevan, G. A.; Donovan, P. J.; Hawke, A. (1950–2026). "ab, ap¹". Geiriadur Prifysgol Cymru Online (in Welsh and English). Aberystwyth: University of Wales Centre for Advanced Welsh & Celtic Studies.
- Thomas, Rebecca (2022). History and Identity in Early Medieval Wales. Cambridge: D. S. Brewer. ISBN 9781800105195.
- Thornton, David E. (2004). "Cadwaladr ap Cadwallon [called Cadwaladr Fendigaid] (d. 664/682), king of Gwynedd". Oxford Dictionary of National Biography (online ed.). Oxford: Oxford University Press. doi:10.1093/ref:odnb/4317. (Subscription, Wikipedia Library access or UK public library membership required.)
- Tolstoy, Nikolai (2008). "When and Where was Armes Prydein Composed?". Studia Celtica. 43. University of Wales Press: 145–49.
- White, Richard B. (1969–1970). "'The Llangadwaladr east window – an examination of the inscription and its personae". Transactions of the Anglesey Antiquarian Society and Field Club. Anglesey Antiquarian Society and Field Club: 80–110.
- Wright, Neil (1986). "Geoffrey of Monmouth and Bede". In Barber, Richard (ed.). Arthurian Literature VI. Woodbridge: Boydell and Brewer. pp. 27–60. IA arthurianliterat0006unse_n5n1.

Regnal titles
Preceded by Cadafael Cadomedd?	King of Gwynedd c. 655 – 682	Succeeded by Idwal Iwrch?
Legendary titles
Preceded by Cadwallon ap Cadfan	King of Britain	None
