= Stephen Greene =

Stephen or Steven Greene may refer to:

- Stephen Greene (politician) (born 1949), Canadian politician
- Stephen Greene (artist) (1917–1999), American artist
- Stephen Greene (social entrepreneur), CEO of the media company Rockcorps
- Stephen Greene, pseudonym of director David O. Russell much in the vein of Alan Smithee
- Steven Greene (born 1982), former Australian rules footballer

== See also ==
- Steven Green (disambiguation)
