= Miranda Aldhouse-Green =

British archaeologist and academic (born 1947)

Miranda Jane Aldhouse-Green, FSA, FLSW (née Aldhouse; born 24 July 1947) is a British archaeologist and academic, known for her research on the Iron Age and the Celts. She was Professor of Archaeology at Cardiff University from 2006 to 2013. Until about 2000, she published as Miranda Green or Miranda J. Green. (Note: Wells, Peter S., "Review Article: Who, Where, and What Were the Celts? The World of the Celts by Simon James; Pagan Celtic Ireland: The Enigma of the Irish Iron Age by Barry Raftery; Celtic Britain by Charles Thomas; Celtic Goddesses: Warriors, Virgins and Mothers by Miranda Green; The World of the Druids by Miranda J. Green; Celtic Sacred Landscapes by Nigel Pennick", American Journal of Archaeology, Vol. 102, No. 4 (Oct., 1998), pp. 814–816, JSTOR, where two of her books, both published in 1997, use different forms.)

== Early life and education ==
She took her first degree at Cardiff University, her MLitt at Lady Margaret Hall, Oxford in 1974, and a PhD from The Open University in 1981.

== Academic career ==
Aldhouse-Green was a member of the faculty at the University of Wales, Newport between 1993 and 2006, being appointed Professor of Archaeology in 1998. She previously held appointments at Worthing and Peterborough Museums and the Open University in Wales. Aldhouse-Green was a Fellow of the Society of Antiquaries of London (FSA) after her election in November 1979. She is a former Vice-President (2002), then President of The Prehistoric Society and has been included in Who's Who since 2004.

Her research interests are Iron Age and Romano-Celtic, particularly Gallo-Roman iconography and sacrificial activities. A report from Universities UK (EurekaUK, June 2006) cites Aldhouse-Green's research into understanding the Celts as one of the "100 major discoveries, developments and inventions", by academics throughout the UK, to have transformed the world in the last 50 years. Her 2018 book Sacred Britannia: The Gods and Rituals of Roman Britain provides an in-depth overview of religion in the province, using evidence from epigraphy and material culture related to a variety of indigenous, eastern and military cults, and their associated rituals.

== Personal life ==
In 1970, Aldhouse-Green married fellow archaeologist Stephen Green (1945–2016); they both took the double-barrelled surname of Aldhouse-Green.

== Selected publications ==
- Sussex Archaeological Collections, 1973.
- A corpus of small cult-objects from the military areas of Roman Britain, British Archaeological Reports, British Series, 1978
- Roman Archaeology, Longman, 1984.
- The Gods of the Celts, Sutton, 1986.
- The World of the Druids, Thames, 1992.
- Celtic Myths, British Museum Press, 1993.
- Celtic Goddesses: Warriors, Virgins and Mothers, British Museum Press, 1995.
- Exploring the World of the Druids, Thames and Hudson, 1997.
- Dictionary of Celtic Myth and Legend, Thames and Hudson, 1997.
- Celtic Art; Symbols and Imagery, Sterling, 1997.
- "Vessels of Death", Antiquaries Journal 78 (1998): 63–84.
- Pilgrims in Stone, British Archaeological Reports, International Series, 1999.
- Dying for the Gods: Human Sacrifice in Iron Age and Roman Europe, Tempus, 2001.
- The Gods of Roman Britain, Shire Publications, 2003.
- The Celts, Weiderfeld and Nicolson, 2004.
- Gwent in Prehistory and Early History, University of Wales Press, 2004.
- An Archaeology of Images, Routledge, 2004.
- The Quest for the Shaman: Shape-Shifters, Sorcerers And Spirit Healers of Ancient Europe, Thames & Hudson, 2005 (with Stephen Aldhouse-Green).
- Boudicca Britannia, Pearson Longman, 2006.
- Bog Bodies Uncovered, Thames and Hudson, 2015.
- Sacred Britannia: The Gods and Rituals of Roman Britain, Thames and Hudson, 2018. ISBN 978-0-500-25222-2
