= Stephen Green =

Stephen, Steven and Steve Green may refer to:

== Law and politics ==
- Steven J. Green (born 1945), United States Ambassador to the Republic of Singapore
- Stephen Green, Baron Green of Hurstpierpoint (born 1948), British politician
- Steve Green (politician) (born 1960), American politician in Minnesota
- Stephen "David" Green, American politician in West Virginia

== Sports ==
- Steve Green (basketball) (born 1953), American basketball player
- Steve Green (footballer) (born 1976), Jamaican footballer
- Steve Green (baseball) (born 1978), Canadian baseball player
- Steven Green (cricketer) (born 1996), English cricketer

== Others ==
- Stephen L. Green (born 1938), American real estate developer
- Steve Green (singer) (born 1956), American Christian music singer
- Steve Green (journalist) (born 1960), British co-editor of the magazine Critical Wave
- Stephen Green (Christian Voice), British Christian lobbyist
- Steven Alan Green, American comedian, writer and producer
- Steven Dale Green (1985–2014), American soldier convicted of war crimes for his role in the Mahmudiyah rape and killings

== See also ==
- Steph Green, American film and television director
- Stephen Greene (disambiguation)
- St Stephen's Green, a Dublin park
