= Rockcorps =

RockCorps is a pro-social marketing and entertainment company that uses music to inspire people to take action by volunteering and getting involved in their community. RockCorps' principal idea is "Give, Get Given”. They do this by producing concerts with exclusive entry tied to participating in a 4 hour community volunteer project.

The company was founded in 2003, to date, over 200,000 volunteers have attended more than 50 live concert events, giving over 900,000 hours to volunteering with more than 2,600 global non-profits.

RockCorps has worked with over 250 artists including Rihanna, David Guetta, Lady Gaga, Drake, Pharrell Williams, Macklemore, Kelis, Raye, Kanye West, Ellie Goulding, Snoop Dogg, Wiz Khalifa, T.I., Janelle Monáe, Busta Rhymes, Damien Marley, Korn, Game, Panic at the Disco and Maroon 5.

== About ==
Anyone who gives 4 hours of their time at a RockCorps organized volunteer event in their local community is given a ticket to an exclusive concert put on by RockCorps.

The volunteer events are always in partnership with local non-profit organizations.

RockCorps itself is not a non-profit organization, instead RockCorps works with brand partners in each country, creating a marketing and communication platform. RockCorps is considered an innovator in the way it works with sponsors in combining marketing and social purpose through entertainment. For brand partners, the platform sits at the intersection of marketing/communications and social purpose - for the audience it sits between entertainment and civic engagement.

RockCorps' first nationwide effort was in 2005 was with brand partner Boost Mobile, a wireless telecommunications company. The first concert took place at Radio City Music Hall in Times Square, New York. In its first year, the Boost Mobile RockCorps (BMRC) movement staged events in six U.S. cities and had 5,000 volunteers who generated 20,000 hours of service. In 2007, Boost Mobile RockCorps expanded the program to 11 cities and over 15,000 volunteers. BMRC had a total of over 30,000 American volunteers and travelled to over 13 U.S. cities.

Since then, RockCorps has worked in 10 countries across 6 continents around the world, including in France with ibis and Orange, UK, Israel with Orange; Australia with Optus; South Africa with Coca-Cola, Latin America with Diageo and Japan with the local Prefecture to help rebuild communities affected by the 2011 Fukushima earthquake tsunami and nuclear incident. 2024 RockCorps combined with ibis for a 15,000 volunteer concert in the Accor Arena as part of the Cultural Olympiad celebrating the Paris Olympics.

== Leadership ==
RockCorps continues to be operated by co-founders: Stephen Greene CBE (CEO), film and TV director Chris Robinson. Original founders also included Grady Lee, Haley Moffett, Paul Hunter, Toby Garrett and Noel Eisenberg

== Apprentice Nation ==
Launched in 2019 in the UK, Apprentice Nation is a RockCorps project, produced together with Multiverse. Apprentice Nation is based on the same Give and Get Given model - but rather than volunteering, young people gain career skills and enter into employment.

UK artists performing have included: Raye, Ghetts, Kojey Radical, 6lack, Tinie, Krept & Konan, Headie One, AJ Tracey and Cat Burns. Sponsors have included BT, EE, Amazon, Lucozade.
