= Llangadwaladr =

Village in Anglesey, Wales

Coordinates: 53.1956°N 4.4219°W

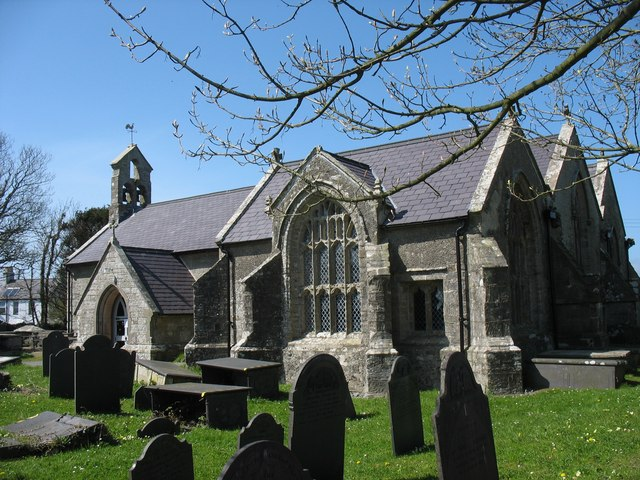
St Cadwaladr's church, Llangadwaladr, Anglesey

Llangadwaladr (Welsh pronunciation) is a small village in south-west Anglesey, Wales, located around 2 miles east of Aberffraw and 3 miles south of Gwalchmai. It is part of the community of Bodorgan, and until 1984 was a community itself.

== Early medieval Kings ==
The Catamanus stone has been present in Llangadwaladr since the 7th century.

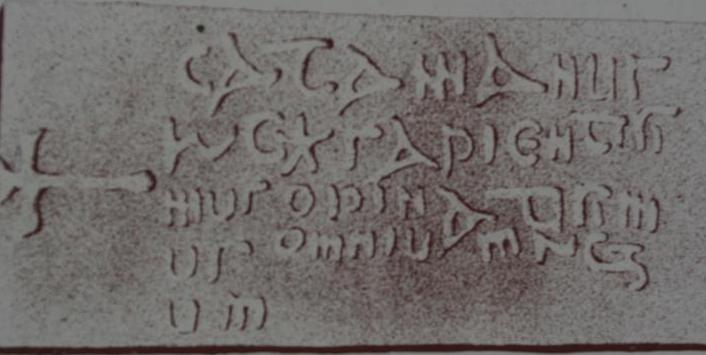
King Cadfan's tombstone as an enhanced image.

The village is a short distance from the ancient llys (English: royal court) of the kings of Gwynedd, and is reputed to have been their royal burial ground. The inscription on one monumental stone in the St. Cadwaladr's Church (pictured) reads "Catamanus rex sapientisimus opinatisimus omnium regum" (English: King Cadfan, most wise and renowned of all kings), suggesting that Cadfan ap Iago (c. 569 – c. 625?) King of Gwynedd, is buried there. One of the windows of St Cadwaladr's church dates from the 12th century. Unusually, the advowson (right of presentation) of the benefice lay with the monarch rather than the bishop, until Disestablishment (1920).

The inscription is the subject of a "detective story" that interprets it as containing a series of coded messages, insulting to the deceased king.

== Notable people ==
- Owen ap Hugh (1518–1613), of Bodeon, near Llangadwaladr, was a Welsh politician.
- Eryl Stephen Thomas (1910–2001), bishop of Monmouth and subsequently of Llandaff was born in this parish.
