= Armes Prydein =

10th-century Welsh prophetic poem

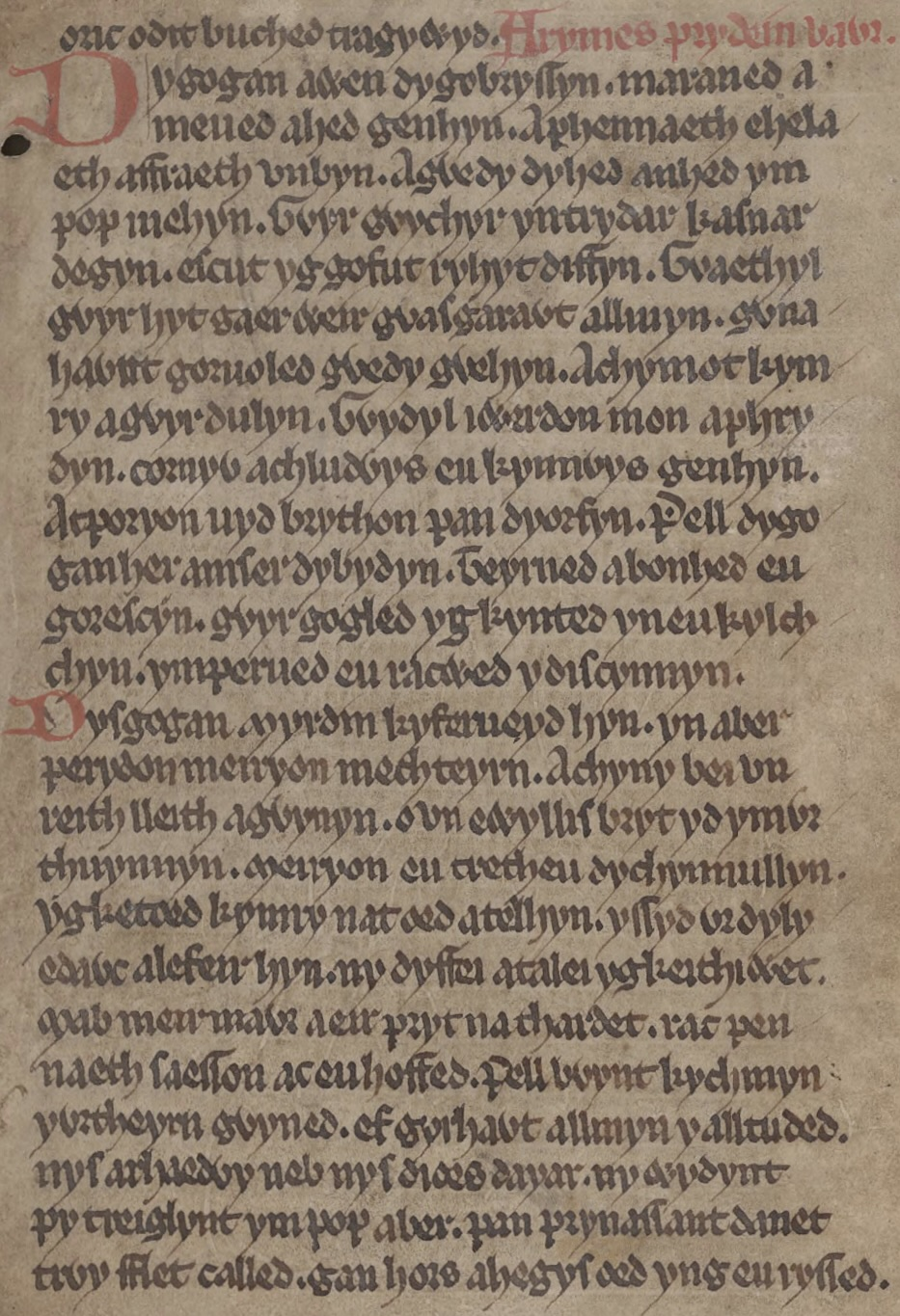
The first page of Armes Prydein

Armes Prydein (Welsh pronunciation: [ˈarmɛs ˈprədəin], The Prophecy of Britain) is an early 10th-century Welsh prophetic poem from the Book of Taliesin.

In a rousing style characteristic of Welsh heroic poetry, it describes a future where all of Brythonic peoples are allied with the Scots, the Irish, and the Vikings of Dublin under Welsh leadership, and together succeed in driving the Anglo-Saxons from Britain forever. Two famous leaders from the distant past are invoked, Conan, the legendary founder of Brittany, and Cadwaladr, a seventh century king of Gwynedd.

The poem is commonly described as an expression of Welsh frustration with the pragmatic, peaceful policies of Hywel Dda towards the then-ascendant Kingdom of Wessex. Edward the Elder (reigned 899–924) had gained acknowledged pre-eminence over almost all of the peoples south of the Firths of Clyde and Forth, including the Gaels, Vikings, English, Cornish, Welsh, and the Cumbrians. After he died and his son Æthelstan had become king (reigned 924–939), an alliance of the kingdoms of Dublin, Scotland, and Strathclyde rose against him and was defeated at the Battle of Brunanburh in 937. Out of keeping with their historical stance alongside the 'Men of the North' (Welsh: Gwŷr y Gogledd) and against the English, the Welsh under Hywel Dda had stood aside, neither helping their traditional compatriots (the men of Strathclyde) nor opposing their traditional enemies (the Saxons of Wessex).

Andrew Breeze dates the poem to the summer or autumn of 940 on the grounds that 1. It refers to Lego, and Legorensis is the Latin adjective for Leicester. He sees this as a reference to a humiliating settlement which King Edmund I of England was forced to accept at Leicester in 940, surrendering the north-east midlands to the Viking leader Olaf Guthfrithson until 942. 2. The poem refers to victory after 404 years. According to the Annales Cambriæ, King Arthur was killed at the Battle of Camlann in 537, and 404 years after that is 941. 3. The poem is therefore looking forward to the annihilation of the Anglo-Saxons in 941.
