= St Cadwaladr's Church =

Church in Anglesey, Wales

St. Cadwaladr Church
- Welsh: Eglwys Ael
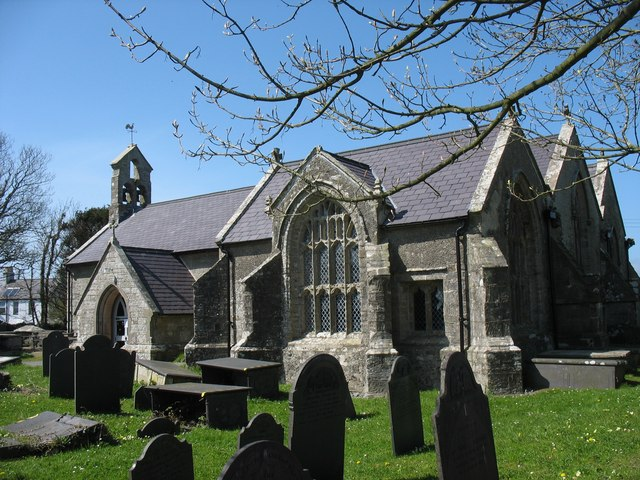
- St. Cadwaladr Church

- Location in Anglesey
- 53°11′45″N 4°25′15″W
- Location: Llangadwaladr
- Country: Wales
- Denomination: Church in Wales
- Previous denomination: Roman Catholic
- Website: churchinwales.org- St. Cadwaladr, Llangadwaladr

History
- Former name: Eglwys Ael
- Status: Church
- Founded: 615
- Dedication: Cadwaladr

Architecture
- Functional status: Active
- Heritage designation: Grade I
- Designated: 30 January 1968
- Style: Late Decorated
- Groundbreaking: 600s
- Completed: 1856

Specifications
- Length: 44.25 ft (13.49 m)

Administration
- Province: Wales
- Diocese: Bangor
- Archdeaconry: Archdeacon of Anglesey
- Deanery: Synod Ynys Mon
- Benefice: Bro Cadwaladr parish

Clergy
- Archbishop: Andy John
- Vicar: The Reverend Canon E C Williams
- Priest: The Reverend E R D Roberts

St Cadwaladr's Church (Welsh: Eglwys Ael) is a Grade I listed church in Llangadwaladr, Anglesey. The location of the current church was established in the 7th century by the Kings of Gwynedd, after whom the church is named, King Cadwaladr. The Church standing today was built in the 'T' shape perpendicular style. The nave is dated to the 12th to early 13th century and the chancel to the 14th. Later the chapels were built, the north in 1640 and the southern Bodowen Chapel in 1661. Then, during 1856 the church underwent restoration, at which time the south porch was added.

== Founding of the church ==
The Welsh diocese of the former Kingdom of Gwynedd was founded c. 546 by Saint Deiniol (Daniel) as the first Bishop of Gwynedd in the Diocese of Bangor. Around 615 AD the current location of St. Cadwaladr's Church was established as royal monastery by the Kings of Gwynedd. King Cadfan ap Iago had been buried in the church, and his tombstone c. 634 is still on display today. Cadfan's grandson Cadwaladr ap Cadwallon (Cadwaladr the blessed, Welsh: Fendigaid) was the patron Saint of the church which is named after him. King Cadwaladr retired to Llangadwaladr to become a monk, he later died in Rome in 664 and his body was brought back to Anglesey and buried at the church (Ael church), which was renamed in his honour. The church was rebuilt in the 12th and 13th centuries with the addition of the nave. The chancel was added in the 14th century. Then in the 15th century a stained glass window was added which is still in the church today after being restored in 1850. The north Chapel (Meyrick) was built c. 1640 and rebuilt in 1801, whilst the south chapel (Owen) was built c. 1661. Then the south Church porch was built in 1856, completing the church which stands today.

=== Catamanus stone ===
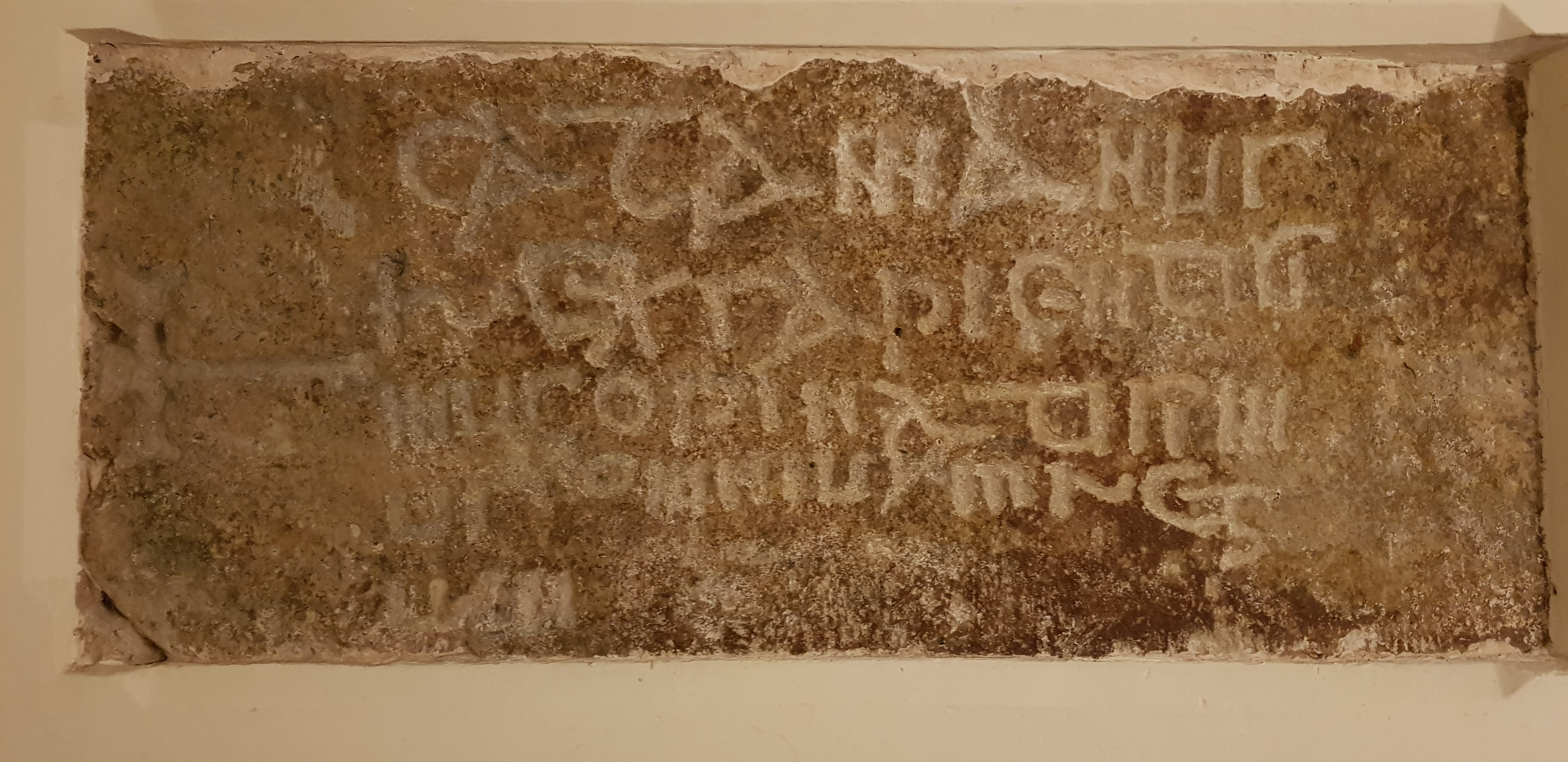
Catamanus stone, circa 600 AD.

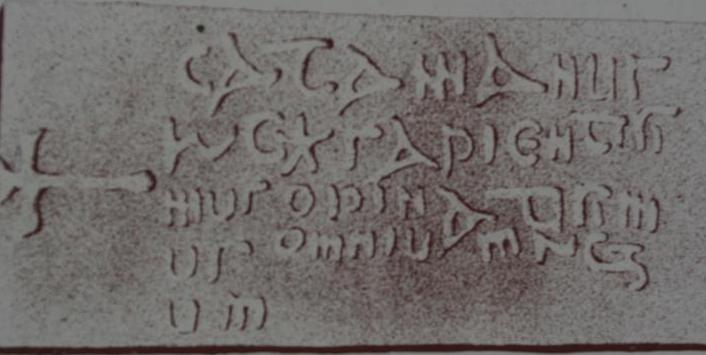
Cadfan's tombstone (enhanced image).

The medieval King of Gwynedd Cadfan ap Iago (King of Britain) was buried in Llangadwaladr. Cadfan's tombstone is currently found in the present church. The tombstone was inscribed c. 634:

Latin: CATAMANUS REX SAPIENTIS MUS OPINATISM US OMNIUM REG UM.
English: King Cadfan, the Wisest and Most Renowned of All Kings.

== Stained glass windows ==
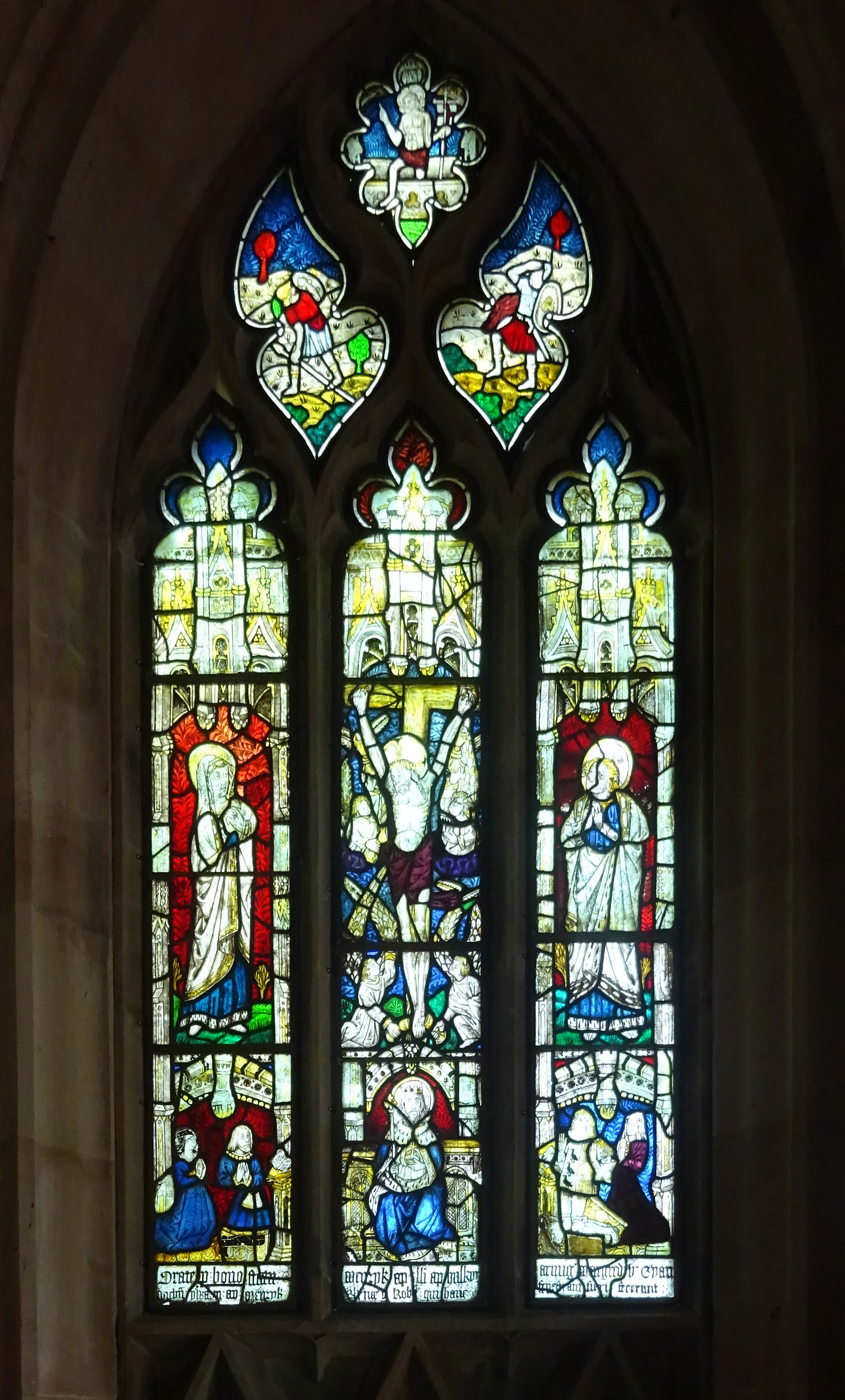
The Crucifixion with the Virgin Mary and St John, glass c. 1490, restored 1850.

It was during the Tudor period that the church was given stained glass windows as a gift from the Meyrick family (Welsh: Meurig) of Bodorgan as thankfulness for the return of their son Owain Ap Meurig after fighting with Henry Tudor at the Battle of Bosworth (1485). The window is dated to 1490, and the painting includes a portrait of St. Cadwaladr and also depictions of Saint Mary and St. John, the glass window was restored in 1850. The stained glass window from the 15th century was hidden in a vault during the Protestant reformation in 1661. The window of 1485 in the chancel east window also shows a Meyrick family member, Owen ap Meuric praying with his wife Ellen. There is a man in armour with the crest of Llywarch ap Bran honouring the patron's great-grandmother Eurddyled (daughter of Dafydd ap Iorweth), an heiress. And another with the crest of Hwfa ap Cynddelw. An inscription for the c. 1485 (Tudor period) glass stained window reads:

Pray for the good estate of Meuric ap Llywelyn ap Hwlcyn esquire; Marged verch Ifan Fychan, Owain ap Meuric, Elen verch Robert, Who caused the window to be made.

During 1860, a local family member in the vicinity Owen Fuller Meyrick donated a glass stained windows depicting the resurrection of Jesus, the healing of a beggar by Saint Peter and John outside the Beautiful Gate and Salome desiring Christ honour her sons. Also, many other fittings were given as gifts from another Meyrick family member, Owen Putland Meyrick of Bodorgan Hall.

== Chapels ==
During the 17th century, an addition of two chapels were built. One of the chapels' were named the Bodowen chapel, in honour of a benefactor, the local Owen family of Bodowen. It was Anne Owen who had married the Sir Hugh Owen and dedicated the chapel in memory of her husband. Also, there is another memorial for Hugh Owen (English Civil War colonel Royalist) from 1660 in the chapel. Then, the second chapel is the north chapel, named the Meyrick chapel, it was developed by Richard Owen Meyrick in 1640. In both chapels there are plaques which record they're construction. Beneath one of the plaques is a vault for Richard's great-grandson Owen Meyrick (1730). Another memorial for the reconstruction of the north chapel was made in 1801 by Owen Putland Meyrick (died 1825). Then, in the second chapel, there is also a marble memorial to the children of Augustus Elliot Fuller. The initials 'F M' are written into the window, they represent the Fuller and Meyrick families.

== Modern history ==
In the newer part of the churchyard, south of the church are the war graves of four British airmen and a Polish airman from World War II. Today the church is a part of the benefice of Bro Cadwaladr parish with 7 other churches in the local area.

== Gallery ==
Images from the church, graveyard and the sculptures and stained glass windows:

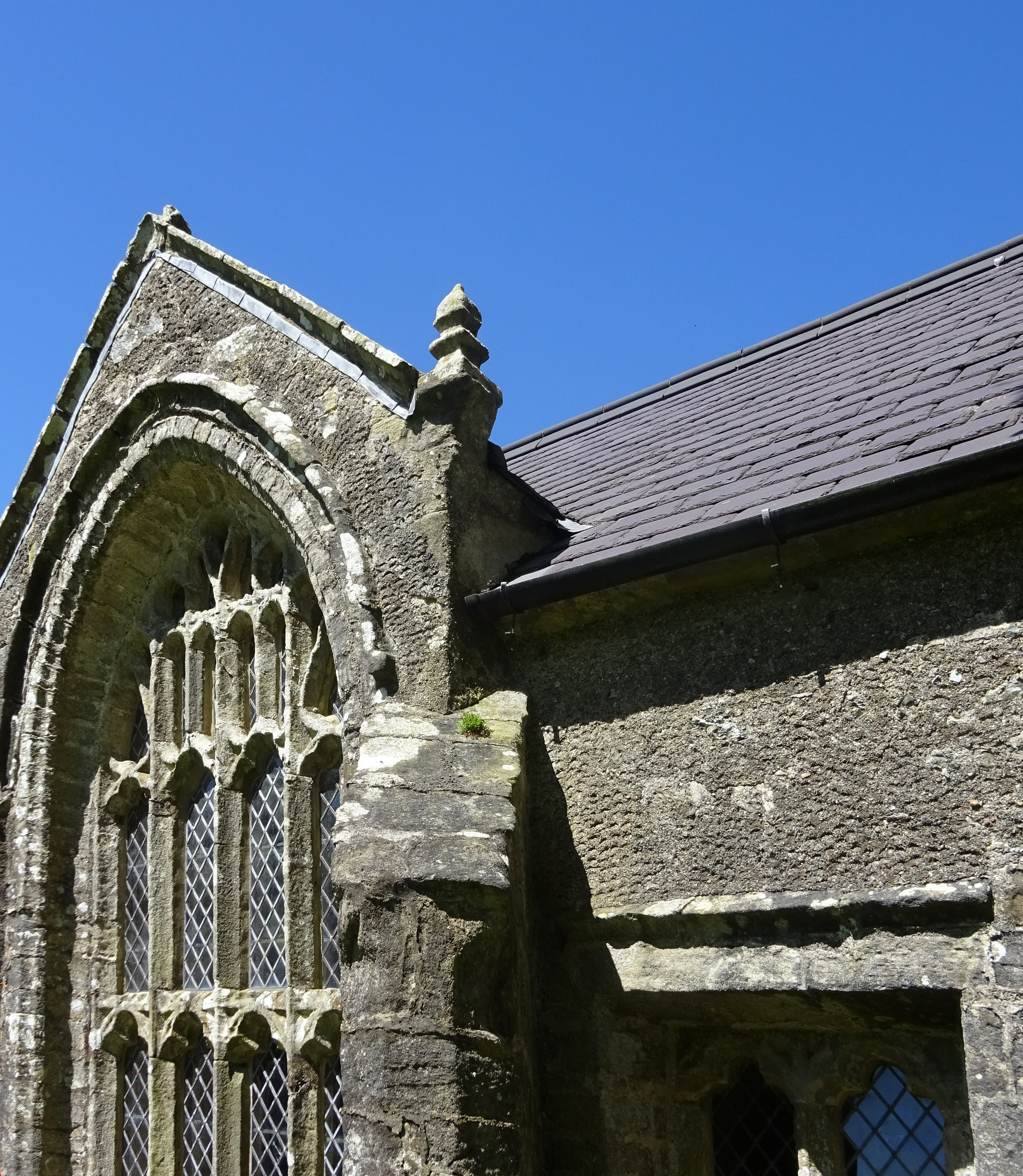
The Church today

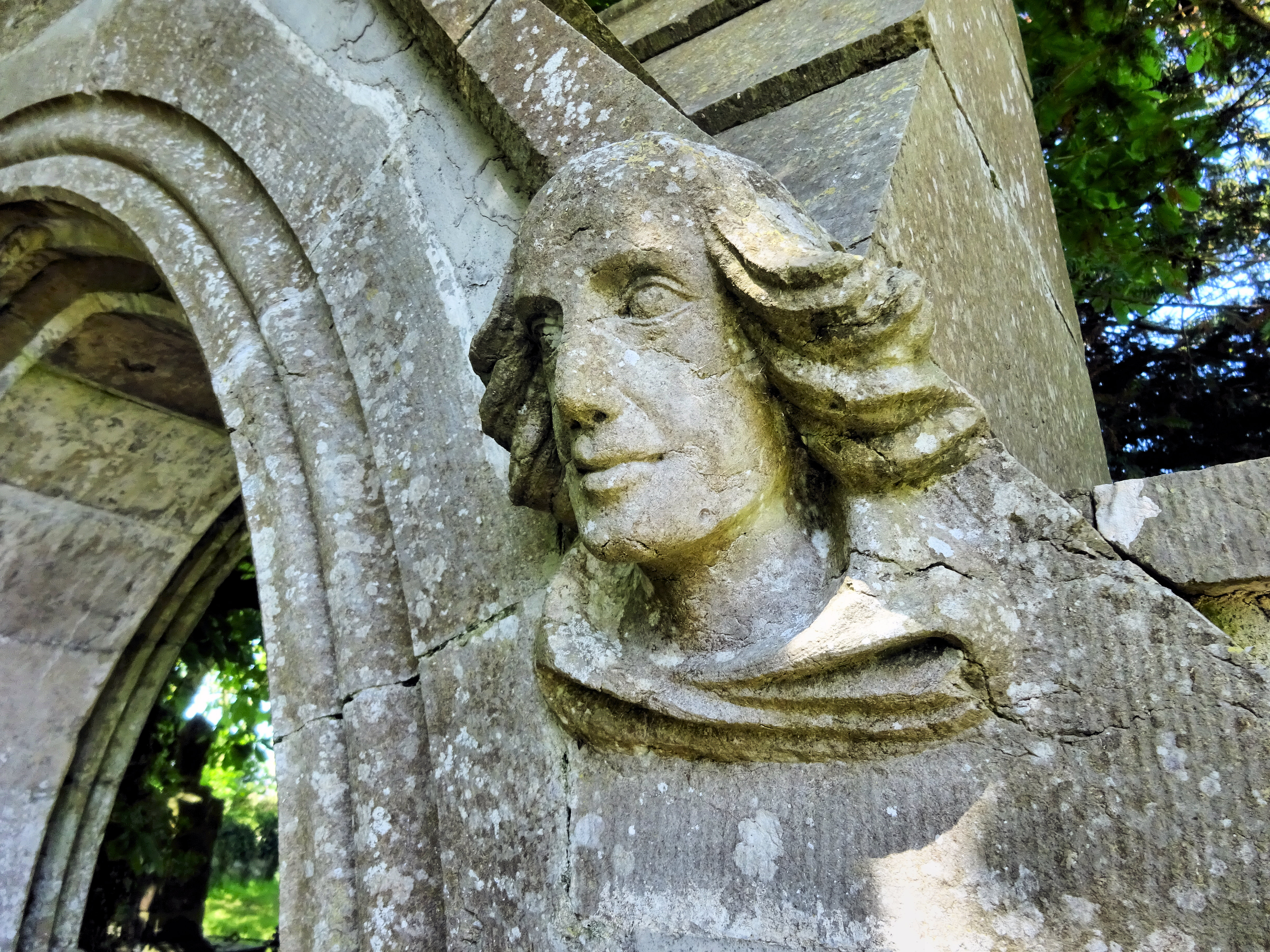
Statue head

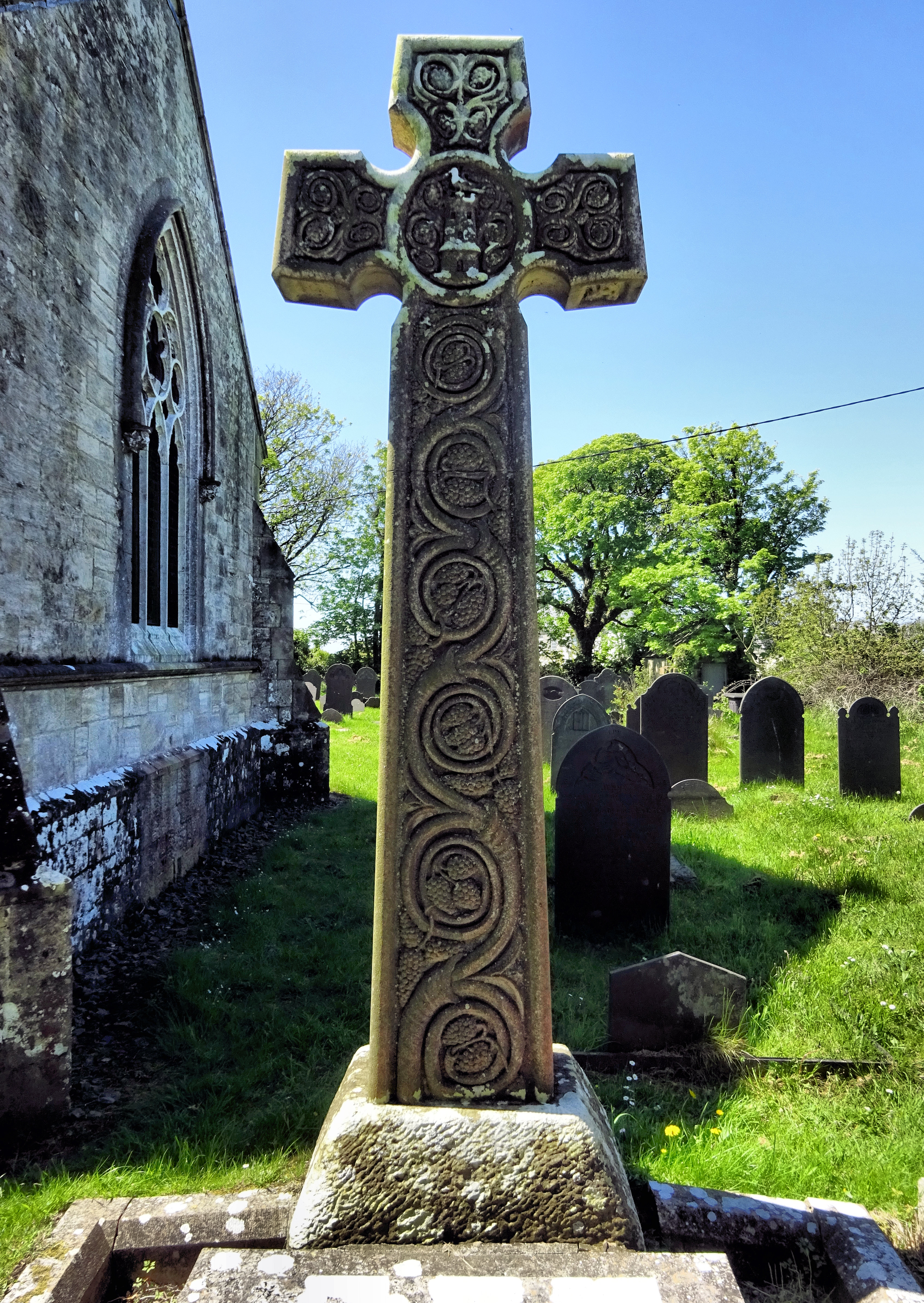
Celtic cross

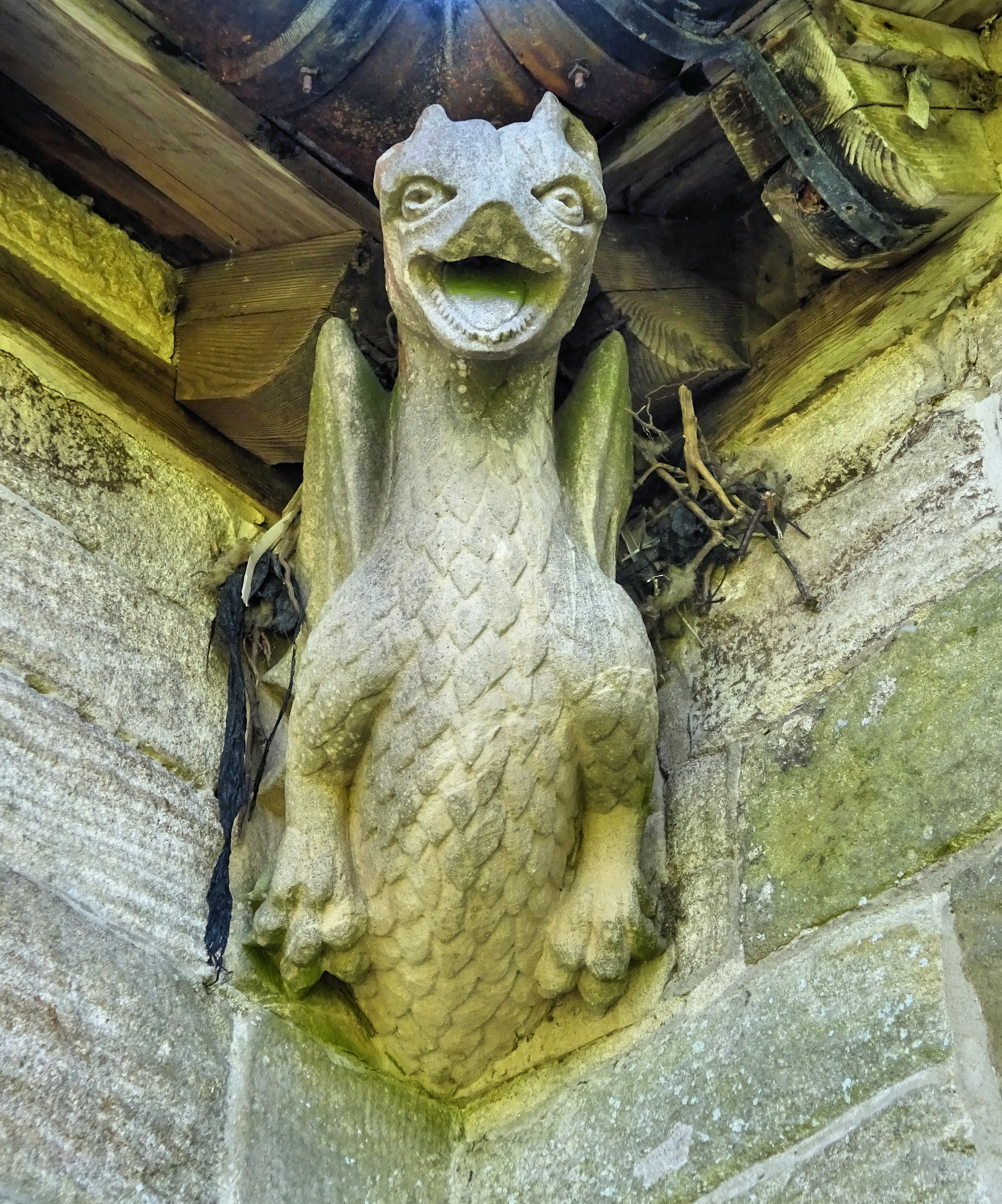
Dragon corbel

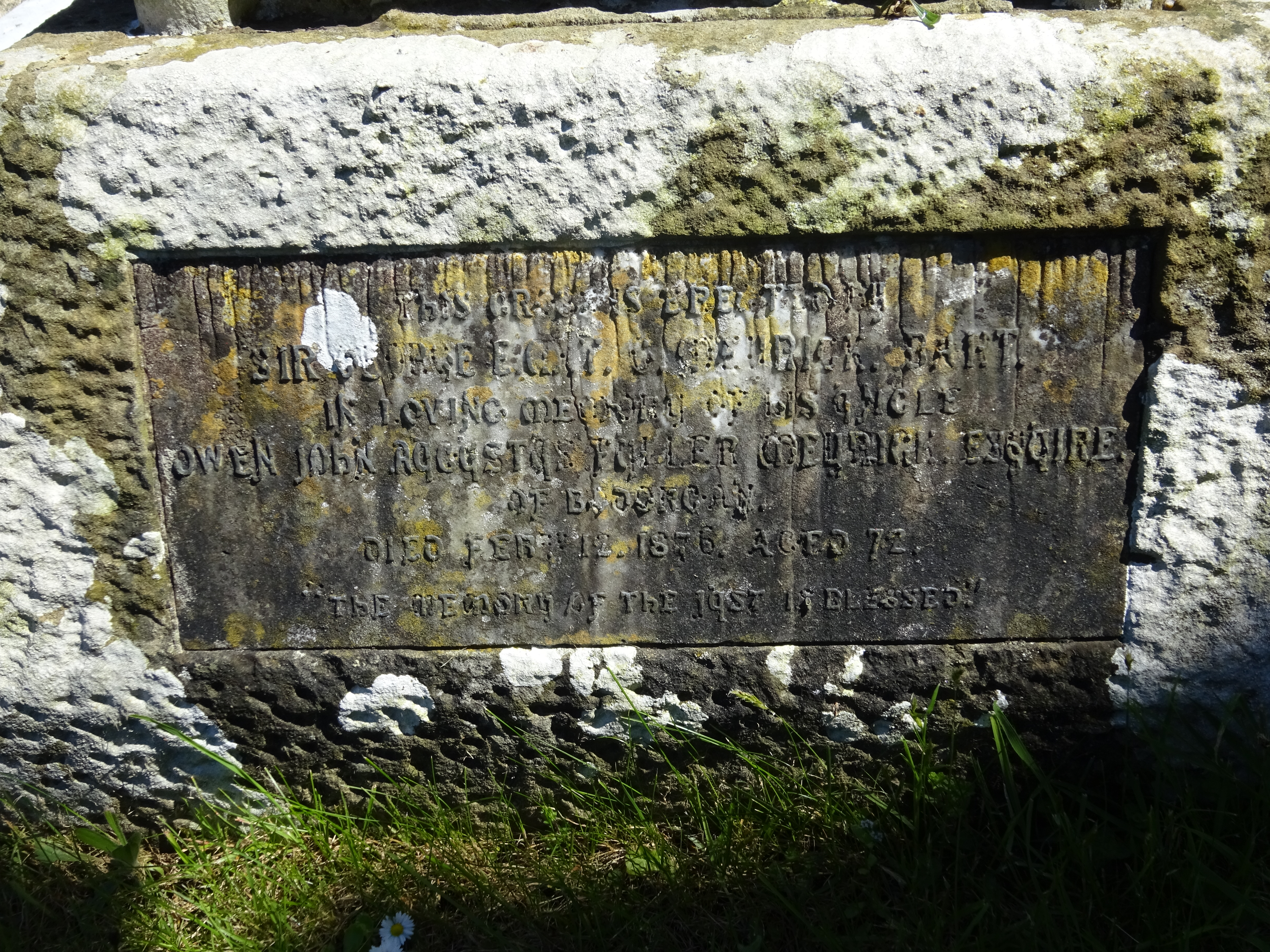
Honour for Owen Putland Meyrick.

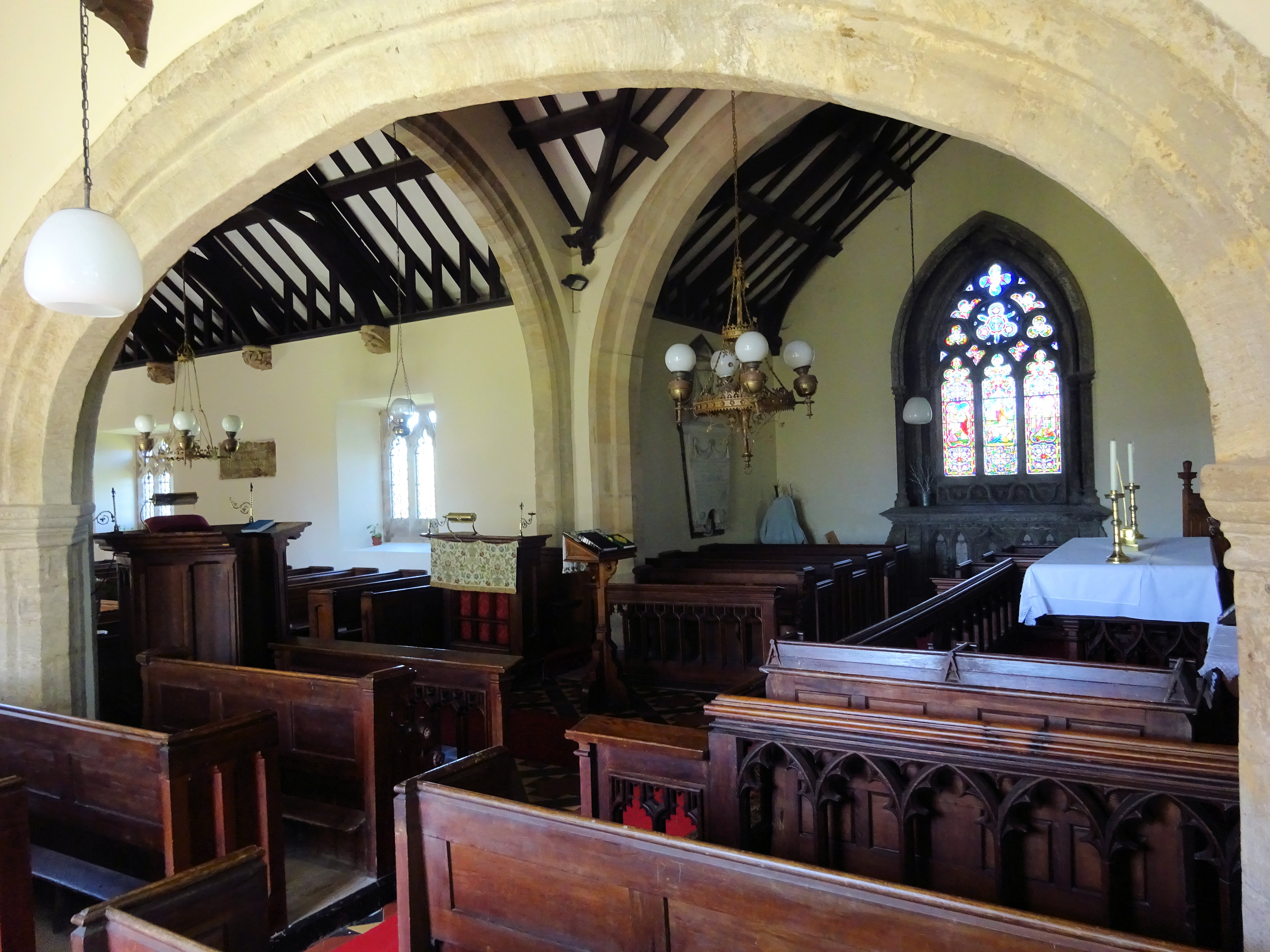
Indoor seating arrangement

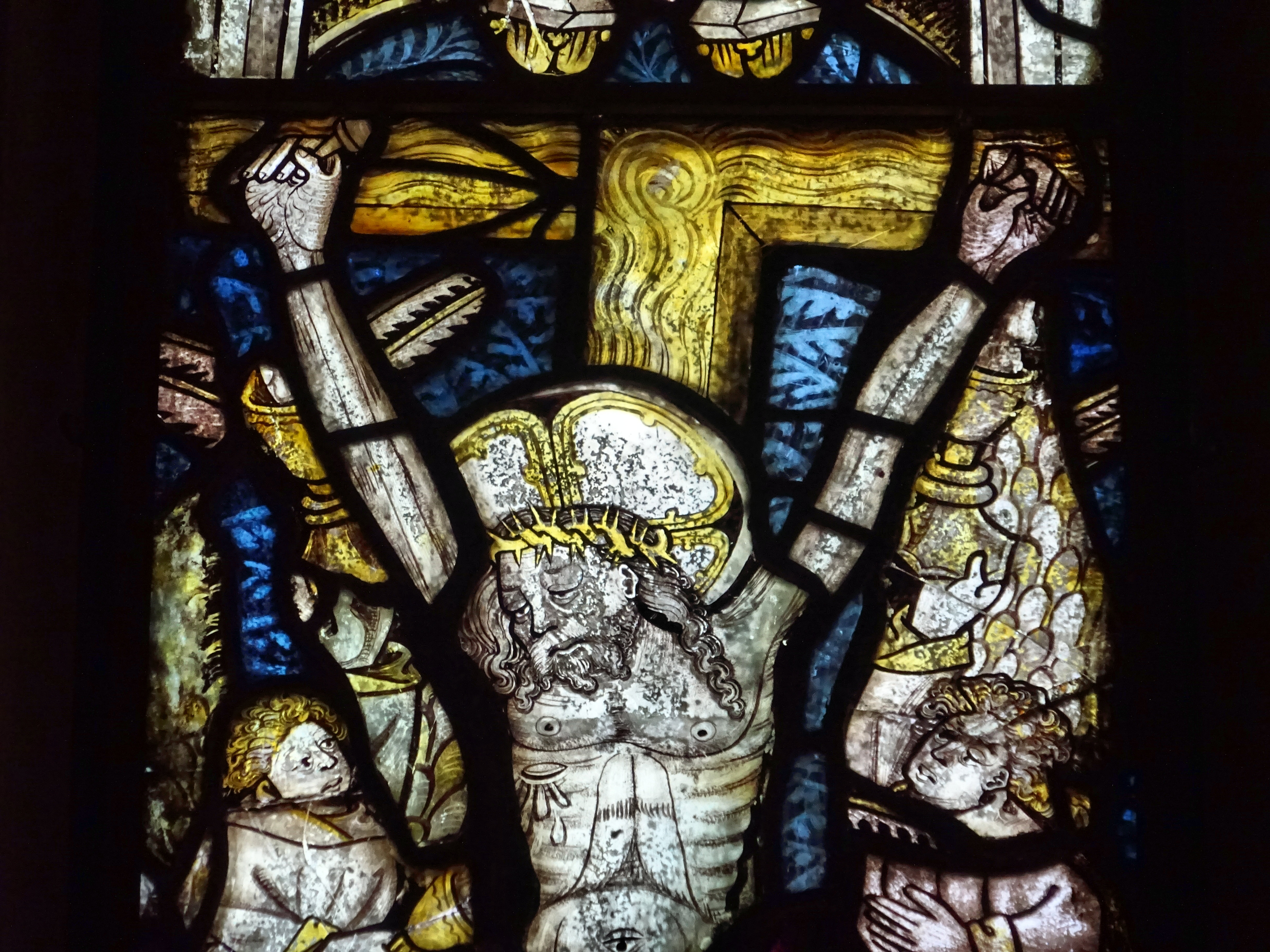
The crucifixion of Christ, stained glass window c. 1490, restored 1850.

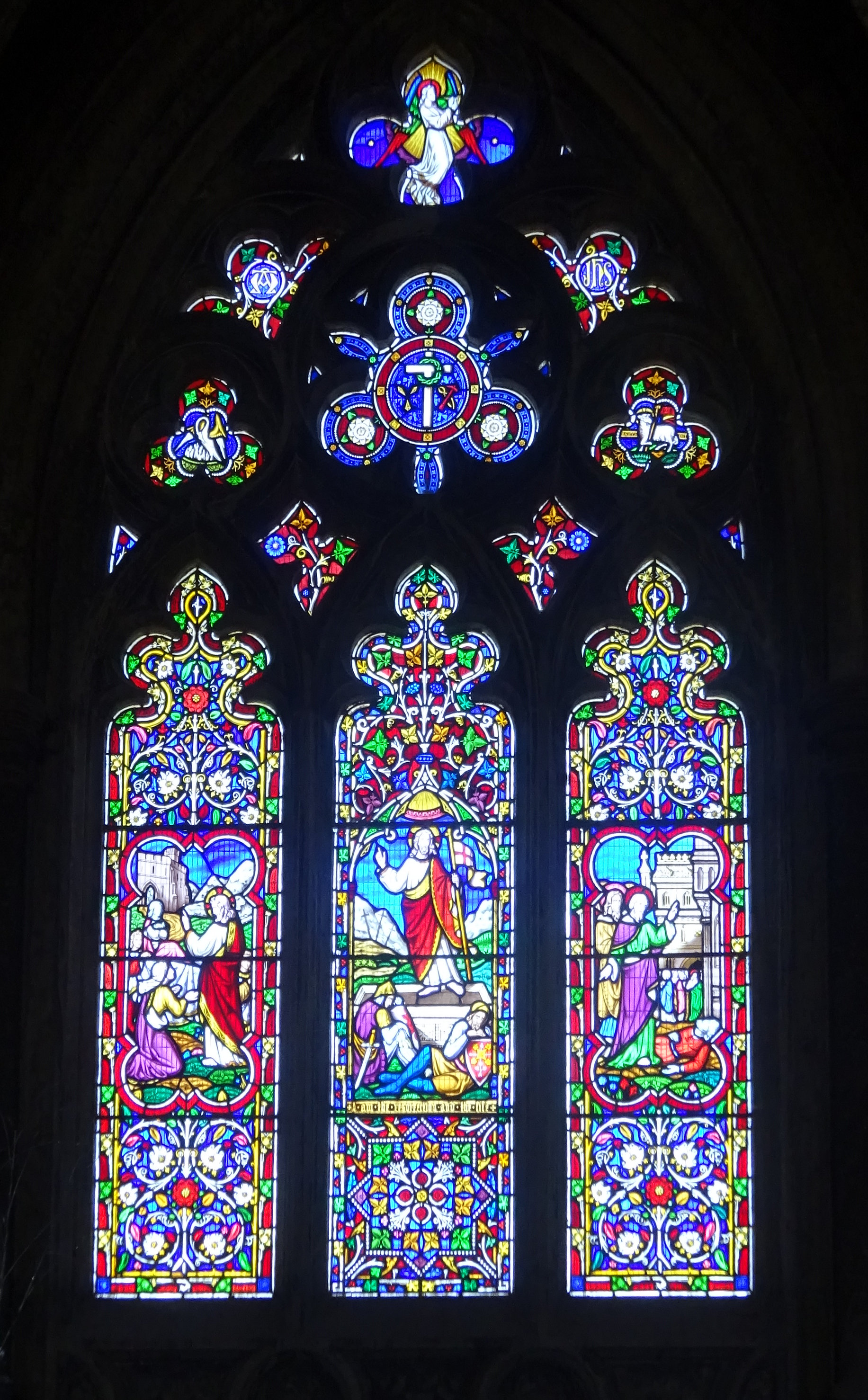
Scenes from the New Testament, glass c. 1860.

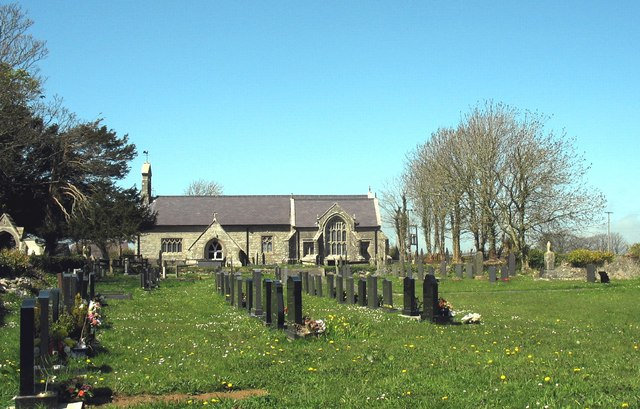
Cemetery

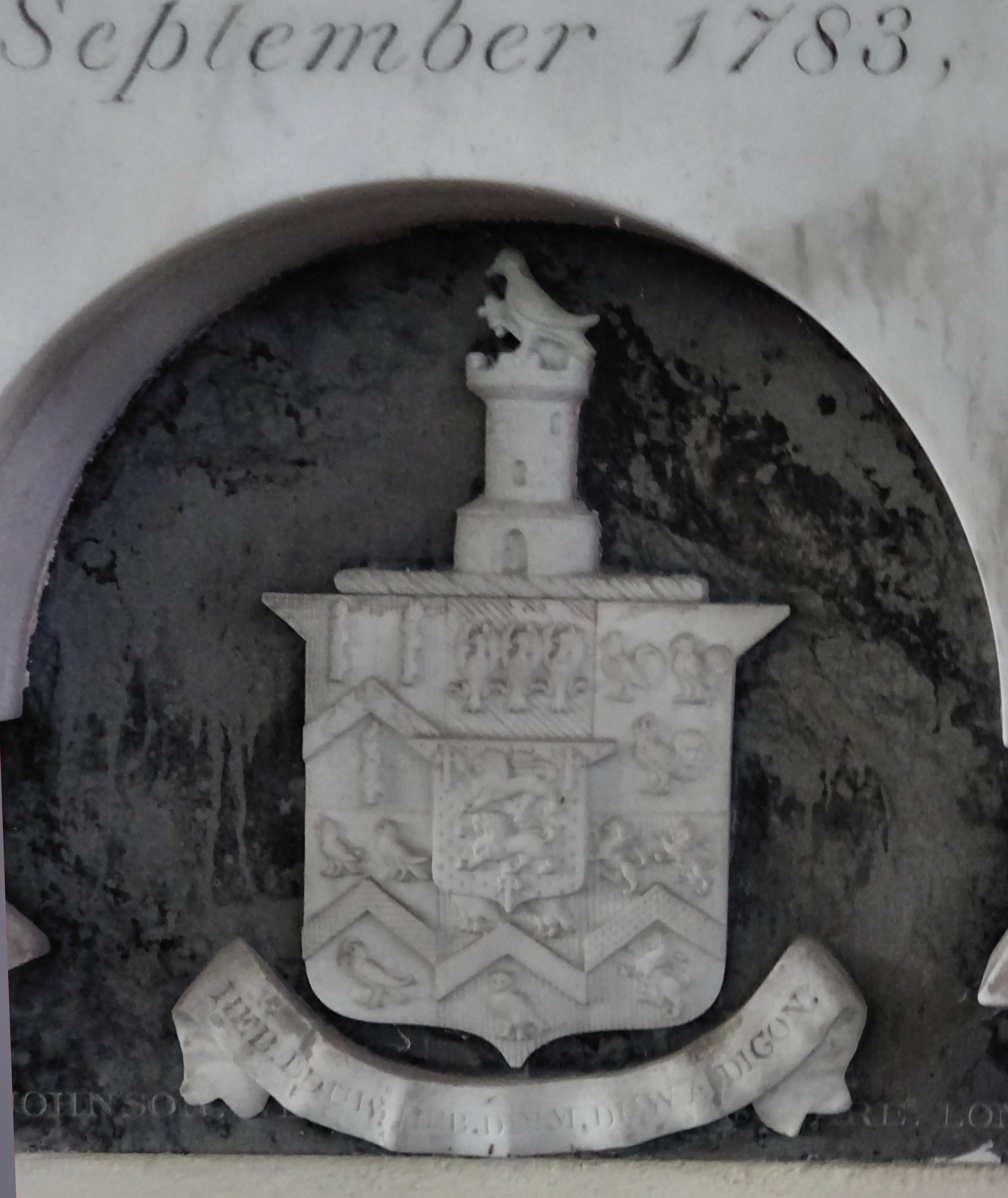
In honour of Owen Putland Meyrick, 1783.

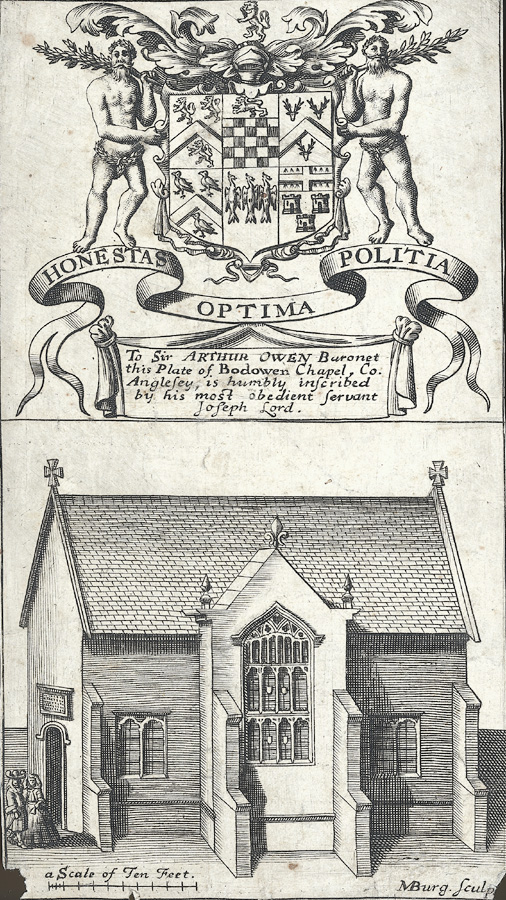
Bodowen chapel built 1661, also coat of arms of Sir Arthur Owen, 3rd Baronet.
