= Cadfan ab Iago =

King of Gwynedd from c. 616 to c. 625

Cadfan ab Iago (c. 569 – c. 625) was King of Gwynedd (reigned c. 616 – c. 625). Little is known of the history of Gwynedd from this period, and information about Cadfan and his reign is minimal.

The historical person is known only from his appearance in royal genealogies, from his grant to Saint Beuno for the monastery at Clynnog Fawr, and from his inscribed gravestone in St Cadwaladr's Church, Llangadwaladr.

Cadfan was the son and successor of King Iago ap Beli and is listed in the royal genealogies of the Harleian genealogies and in the genealogies from Jesus College MS 20. (Note: the pedigree is given as: ... map Rotri map mermin map etthil merch cinnan map rotri map Intguaul map Catgualart map Catgollaun map Catman map Iacob map Beli map Run ..., and from there back to Cunedda and his ancestors.) (Note: Phillimore, The pedigree is given as ... Cynan tintaeth6y. M. Rodri mol6yna6c. M. Idwal I6rch. M. Kadwaladyr vendigeit. M. Katwalla6n. M. Kad6ga6n. M. Iago. M. Beli. M. Run hir. M. Maelg6n g6yned ..., and from there back to Cunedda.) Cadfan came to the throne near the time of the Battle of Chester (Welsh: Gwaith Caerlleon) in 616, in which the Northumbrians under Æthelfrith decisively defeated the neighbouring Welsh Kingdom of Powys and then massacred the monks of Bangor Is Coed. However, there is no evidence that Gwynedd had any part in the battle, so Cadfan's accession at that time appears to be no more than coincidence.

Cadfan was succeeded as king by his son, Cadwallon ap Cadfan.

== Gravestone ==
Cadfan's gravestone is at Llangadwaladr (English: Cadwaladr's Church) on Anglesey, a short distance from the ancient llys (royal court) of the kings of Gwynedd, and reputed to be their royal burial ground. The inscription refers to him as sapientisimus ('most wise'), and as this term is historically used for ecclesiastics, it suggests that at some point, Cadfan had resigned as king to live a consecrated life. (Note: In the footnote. Sapientisimus here applied to him means simply, in the Latin of the period, a 'highly learned man', and presumably, therefore, an ecclesiastic. Compare the epithet of Gildas (Gildas Sapiens), implying clerical status, not natural wisdom.) The inscription is the subject of a "detective story" that interprets it as containing a series of coded messages, insulting to the deceased king.

Photographic image of the tombstone at St Cadwaladr's Church, Llangadwaladr

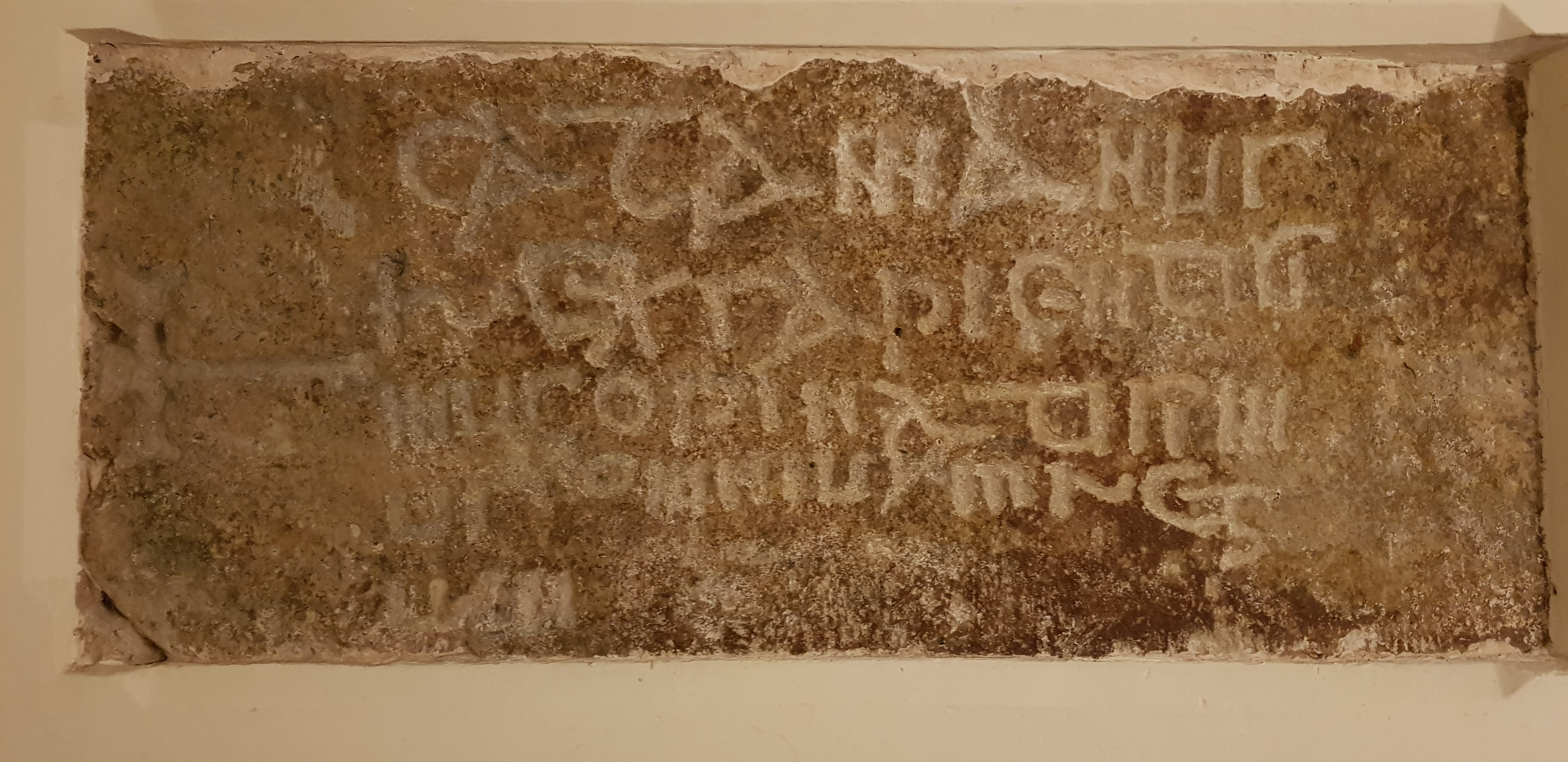
The Catamanus stone in Llangadwaladr church, 2018

Enhanced image:

King Cadfan's gravestone in Llangadwaladr church

Inscribed c. 634 AD, Latin: Catamanus rex sapientisimus opinatisimus omnium regum, in English: King Cadfan, the Wisest and Most Renowned of All Kings.

== Saint Beuno ==
Saint Beuno and the monastery at Clynnog Fawr are often cited in conjunction with Cadfan. An 1828 article by P. B. Williams in the Cymmrodorion cited a manuscript stating that a local prince by the name of "Gwytheint" gave Clynnog Fawr to God and Saint Beuno, who was then Abbot at the monastery at Clynnog, and that the donation was free from taxes and obligations forever. It goes on to say that Beuno founded a convent at Clynnog in 616 and that Cadfan was Beuno's great patron, promising him extensive lands. The promise was carried out by Cadfan's son, King Cadwallon, and that Cadwallon was given a golden sceptre worth 60 cows as a token of acknowledgment. (Note: A consistent version is given in William Jenkins Rees's 1853, Lives of the Cambro-British Saints) (Life of Saint Beino) (Rees was the editor of the 1828 Cymmrodorion that published P. B. Williams's account.)

There are minor variations of these accounts, sometimes with the details rearranged, such as in Rice Rees's Essay on the Welsh Saints of 1836, which states that Cadfan (rather than his son Cadwallon) was given the golden sceptre by Beuno.

== Fictionalisation by and after Geoffrey of Monmouth ==
The largely fictional stories of ancient Britain written by Geoffrey of Monmouth use the names of many historical personages as characters, and the use of these names is a literary convenience made in order to advance the plot of Geoffrey's stories. One of these stories uses the names of Cadfan and other contemporary people, telling of how a certain Edwin spent his exiled youth at the court of King Cadfan, growing up alongside Cadfan's son, the future King Cadwallon. There is no historical basis for this story, as is readily acknowledged in the preface of works on the subject.

Nevertheless, a "traditional" story arose blending Geoffrey's fiction with known history, implying that the future King Edwin of Northumbria had actually spent his youth at the court of King Cadfan, growing up alongside Cadfan's son, the future King Cadwallon. In point of fact, Cadwallon and Edwin were enemies with no known youthful connections: King Edwin invaded Gwynedd and drove King Cadwallon into exile, and it would be Cadwallon, in alliance with Penda of Mercia, who would ultimately defeat and kill Edwin in 633 at the Battle of Hatfield Chase (Welsh: Gwaith Meigen). The story that they had spent an idyllic youth together may have had a romantic appeal.

What is known from history is that in 588 King Ælla of Deira died, and Æthelfrith of Bernicia took the opportunity to invade and conquer Deira, driving Ælla's three-year old infant son, the future Edwin of Northumbria, into exile. Edwin would eventually ally himself with Rædwald of East Anglia in 616, defeating and killing Æthelfrith and becoming one of Northumbria's most successful kings. Edwin's life in exile is unknown but there is no historical basis for placing him at the court of King Cadfan.

== See also ==
- Family tree of Welsh monarchs

== Sources ==
- Chadwick, Nora K. (1959), "The Conversion of Northumbria: A Comparison of Sources", Celt and Saxon: Studies in the Early British Border, Cambridge: Cambridge University Press (published 1963), pp. 138–166, ISBN 0-521-04602-5
- Davies, John (1990), A History of Wales (First ed.), London: Penguin Group (published 1993), ISBN 0-7139-9098-8
- Lloyd, John Edward (1911), A History of Wales from the Earliest Times to the Edwardian Conquest, vol. I (2nd ed.), London: Longmans, Green, and Co. (published 1912)
- Phillimore, Egerton, ed. (1887), "Pedigrees from Jesus College MS. 20", Y Cymmrodor, vol. VIII, Honourable Society of Cymmrodorion, pp. 77–92
- Phillimore, Egerton (1888), "The Annales Cambriae and Old Welsh Genealogies, from Harleian MS. 3859", in Phillimore, Egerton (ed.), Y Cymmrodor, vol. IX, Honourable Society of Cymmrodorion, pp. 141–183
- Rees, Rice (1836), An Essay on the Welsh Saints, London: Longman, Rees, Orme, Brown, Green, and Longman, Rees
- Rees, William Jenkins (1853), Lives of the Cambro-British Saints, Llandovery: William Rees
- Rhys, John (1904), Celtic Britain (3rd ed.), London: Society for Promoting Christian Knowledge
- Williams, P. B. (1828), "Historical Account of the Monasteries and Abbeys in Wales", in Rees, William Jenkins (ed.), Transactions of the Cymmrodorion, vol. II, London: Honourable Society of Cymmrodorion, pp. 203–262, Part 4
- Williams, John (1844), The Ecclesiastical Antiquities of the Cymry, London: W. J. Cleaver

Regnal titles
Preceded by Iago ap Beli	King of Gwynedd c. 616 – c. 625	Succeeded by Cadwallon ap Cadfan
Legendary titles
Vacant Interregnum Title last held by Keredic	King of Britain	Succeeded by Cadwallon ap Cadfan
