= Basil Fulford Lowther Clarke =

British priest

Basil Fulford Lowther Clarke (6 March 1908 – 27 January 1978) was a priest and architectural historian. He served as Secretary of the Oxford Diocesan Advisory Committee for the Care of Churches, a member of the Council for the Care of Churches, on the advisory board for the Care of Redundant Churches and was a member of the Westminster Abbey Architectural Advisory Panel.

== Life ==
Basil Fulford Lowther Clarke was born on 6 March 1908, the son of the Rev. W. K. L. Clarke. He was educated at St John's School, Leatherhead and St John's College, Durham. After Durham he trained to be a priest at Cuddesdon Theological College and was ordained in 1932. He served as curate at Coulsdon, Monmouth, Watford and Oxford before being appointed Vicar of Knowl Hill, Berkshire, a position he held from 1944 to 1974.

Clarke and his brother took an early interest in church architecture and were encouraged by their father to record details of any church they visited. Starting as a schoolboy hobby, during his life he prepared over thirty one handwritten books accompanied by nineteen boxes of documents and postcards from churches he had visited. He is reputed to have prepared card indexes on two thirds of the 16,000 churches in Great Britain.

Clarke’s main interest was Victorian church architecture and the gothic revival. His passion for the genre led him to become a writer of books on the subject and he is notable for his book, Church Builders of the 19th Century, which was published in 1938 when Victorian architecture was somewhat ridiculed.

Clarke contributed to the Collins Guide to English Parish Churches by Sir John Betjeman and also wrote about Anglican church architecture outside the British Isles, the Parish Churches of London, The Building of the Eighteenth Century Church and, with Sir John Betjeman, English Churches.

In 1970, Clarke was appointed an honorary Canon of Christ Church, Oxford. On retirement, he concentrated his energies on church architecture and preservation, serving on a number of administrative bodies.

Clarke died on 27 January at the age of 69. In 1939 Clarke married Eileen Noel Coates and was survived by her, one son and two daughters.
