= Steven Alan Green =

American comedian, writer and producer

Steven Alan Green is an American comedian, writer and producer.

A fixture at the Comedy Store in Los Angeles during its 1980s heyday, Green became an early advocate of the London comedy scene and was responsible for introducing many American acts to the British circuit, most notably through his production of three "High on Laughter" charity galas during the early years of the 2000s. At one of these galas, a temporarily infirm Jerry Lewis was unable to go on, spurring the creation of Green's 2003 one-person show, I Eat People Like You For Breakfast. Green has written for Jimmie Walker, Jay Leno, Arsenio Hall and radio personality Frazer Smith, among others. He is currently working on several film projects, as both writer and producer.

His recent one-person shows have received attention from such publications as Time Out London, the Evening Standard, The Scotsman and The Guardian. He has also done a considerable amount of voice-over work, most notably a series of spots for the UK's Paramount Comedy Channel which culminated in Green's on-air hosting of a weekend South Park marathon in late 2006.
