= Stephen Greene (social entrepreneur) =

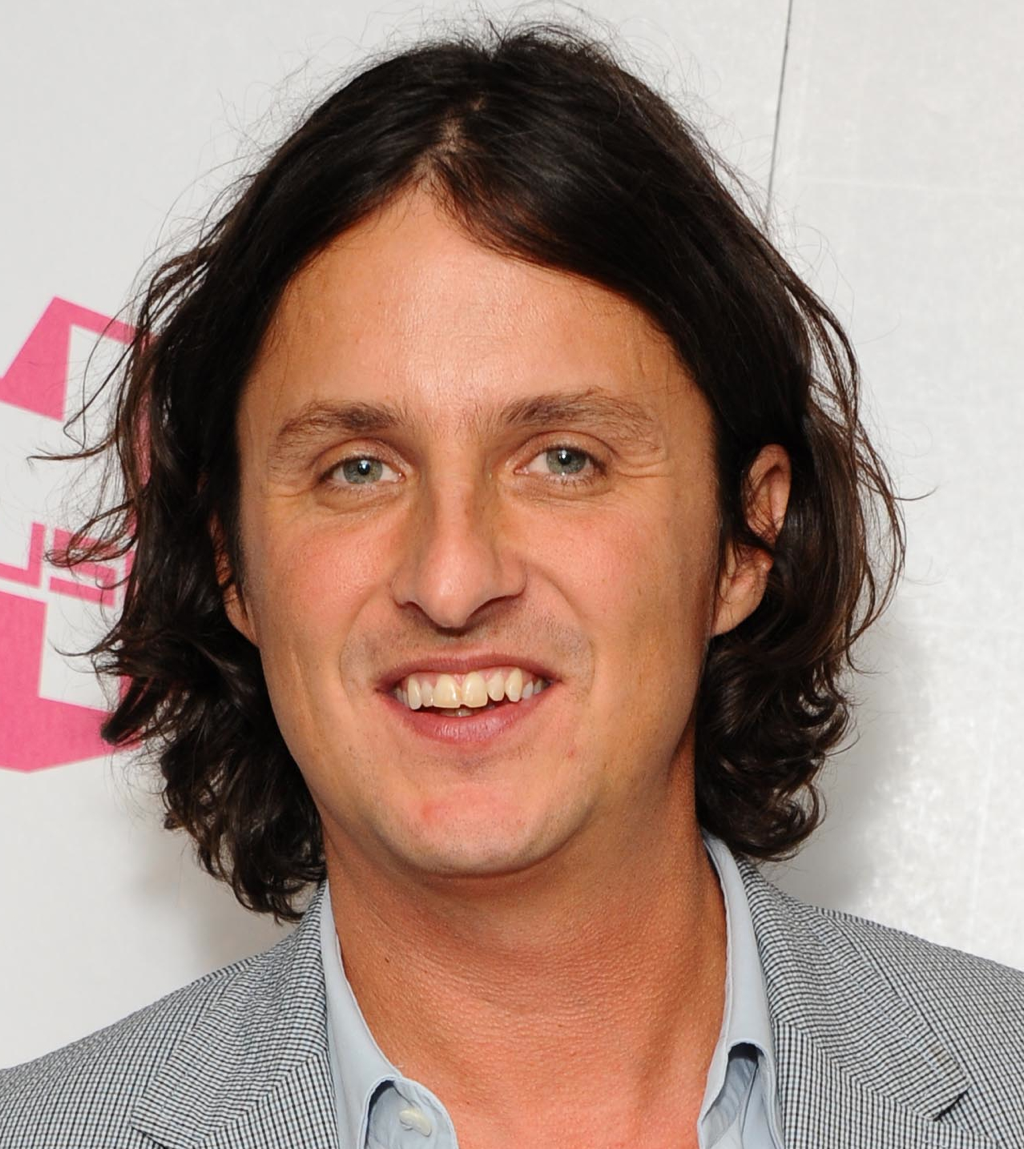
- Known for: Creating social enterprises

Stephen Greene CBE is the CEO of the international pro-social media company Rockcorps. As head of RockCorps, he has overseen the production of over 50 volunteer-exclusive concerts worldwide, featuring music artists such as Lady Gaga, P Diddy, Maroon 5 and Rihanna. In 2012 the British Prime Minister, David Cameron, appointed Greene as Executive Chairman of the independent management body of the National Citizen Service. The appointment was emblematic of the Prime Minister’s "Big Society" policy efforts, helping provide teens with social and technical skills through their involvement in community work. Born in Portland, Oregon, USA, Greene currently resides in London, UK.

== RockCorps ==
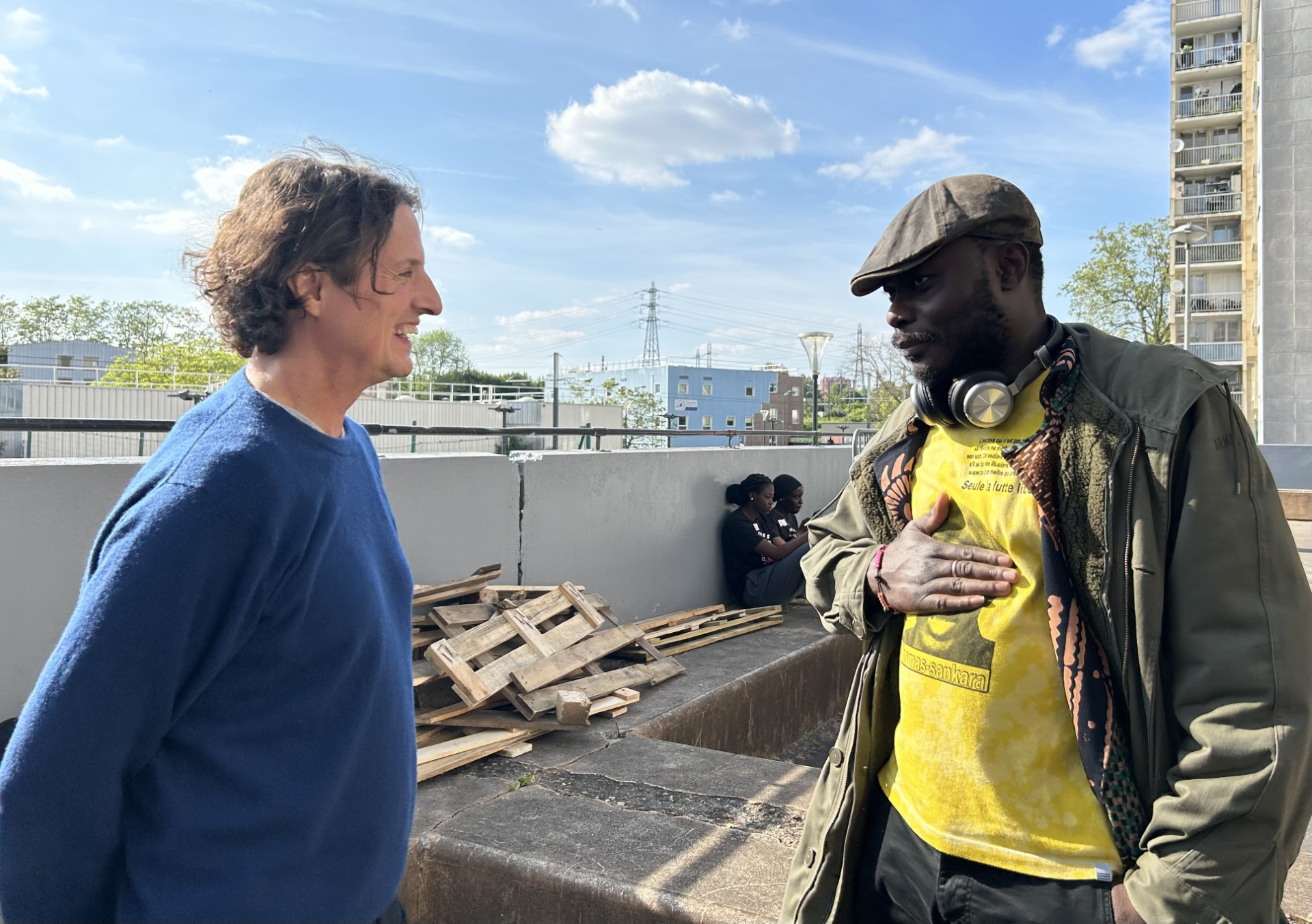
Stephen Greene (on left) in France in 2024.

In 2003, Stephen co-founded RockCorps with Grady Lee, commercial film and television director Chris Robinson, Haley Moffett, Toby Garrett, Paul Hunter and Noel Eisenberg. RockCorps produces pop, rock and hip-hop concerts, distributing tickets exclusively to volunteers who perform 4 hours of service at a RockCorps-organized volunteer project for the benefit of a local non-profit group or charity. Tickets to shows cannot be purchased, they must be earned. RockCorps' first concert took place in New York City in 2005. Since then RockCorps has produced over 50 celebratory concerts in the United States, Great Britain, France, Israel, Mexico, Venezuela, South Africa, Colombia and Australia. Shows have featured major international artists including Lady Gaga, Rihanna, Maroon 5, Busta Rhymes, Diddy, Smashing Pumpkins and Primal Scream.

Over the past seventeen years RockCorps has leveraged the power of music to inspire young people to give back over half a million hours of volunteer work to their communities. RockCorps has worked with over 2,500 partners in the non-profit sector, engaged directly with more than 180,000 volunteers on four continents and compiled a worldwide membership of over 1,000,000 people.

In 2021, along with Lord Blunkett, Greene established UK Year of Service – a paid year long domestic service corps similar to Americorps in the USA.

Greene was appointed Commander of the Order of the British Empire (CBE) in the 2019 Birthday Honours for services to young people.
