= Alain II Hir =

King of Brittany (625-690)

- Alain II the tall
- Born: 630
- Died: 690
- Occupation: king of Brittany

Alain II Hir, "Alain II the tall", (c. 630 – 690), also known as Alan Hir, was a king of Brittany who succeeded his father Iudicael as King of Cornouaille; not to be confused with the contemporary Judicael, the King of Domnonee who was son of Iudhael, King of Domnonee.

He was the grandson of Hoel III, King of Brittany and descended from Aldroen, grandson of Conan Meriadoc of the Welsh tale Breuddwyd Macsen Wledig via his son Gwereg, the historical "Erec" from the Breton Romance Erec et Enide. He was the father of a supposed figure named Ifor who ruled Cornwall after reconquering it from the West Saxons and then left it to his nephew either Idwal Iwrch, King of Gwynedd or his son Rhodri Molwynog, King of the Britons as versions of the story vary, and his daughter, who in welsh genealogical manuscripts is either the mother or wife of Idwal Iwrch and possible mother of the aforementioned Rhodri Molwynog.

According to Welsh tradition he was a 4th great nephew of Arthur by the marriage of Arthur's sister Elen (sometimes mistaken as her other sisters in later Romance as Anna or Gwyar) to Hoel II of Brittany.

== Cadwaladr ==
According to Geoffrey of Monmouth, Cadwaladr fled from Britain during a devastating plague. He sought help from Alain to restore the British to power in their homeland, but he then received an angelic visitation which told him that he must renounce his crown and go to Rome as a penitent. If he did so the British people (Welsh and Bretons) would be reunited in the future and the English (Anglo-Saxons) expelled from the land. King Alain then consults books of prophesies written by the Sybils and by Merlin, discovering that "these and other prophecies accorded to the divine answer that Cadwaladr had heard" (in the version reported in The Chronicles of England). Alain assures Cadwaladr that he must do as the heavenly voice commanded.
