= Urbs Iudeu =

Ancient city of disputed location in the United Kingdom

Urbs Iudeu (Urbs Judeu/Ludeu) was a city, whose location is now unknown, which according to the ninth-century Historia Brittonum was besieged in 655 AD by Penda, King of Mercia, and Cadafael, King of Gwynedd.

The siege can be seen as an important episode in a long-running war between Mercia and Northumbria in the years 616–679. This war was fought in the area north of the River Trent, in particular in and around the Peak District (Wirksworth) also around Heathfield (Doncaster), Elmet (Aberford) and Lindsey (Lincoln), as these were provinces of Northumbria at the time.

== Place and location ==
The etymology of the name Urbs Iudeu is uncertain, as is its location; this difficulty is compounded by the fact that the place-names of other locations mentioned in relation to the siege also cause interpretative problems. A geographical survey of Britain in the eighth-century Ecclesiastical History of the English People by Bede mentions a place called urbs Giudi ("the town of Giudi") on the Firth of Forth, generally thought to be what is now Stirling. The superficial similarity of the names has led many scholars to assume that Bede's urbs Giudi was the same place as the Historia Brittonum's urbs Iudeu, and that urbs Iudeu was on the Firth of Forth. But this location is far beyond the kingdoms involved in the war and recent research has suggested that urbs Iudeu and urbs Giudi were different places.. A recent hypothesis places the location at North Berwick Law, and that the name is associated with nearby Kingston Common.

Oswestry has been suggested as the site of the battle of Maserfelth: it is also too far from the battle zone and an unlikely location as the Welsh and the Mercians were allies at this time. Wirksworth in the Peak District is the principal candidate for the location of Urbs Iudeu due to its antiquity, its strategic location and its Roman and Northumbrian remains.

== Background and origins of the battle ==
In or about 616 AD, the Northumbrians, apparently attempting to expand their kingdom under King Æthelfrith, fought the native Britons and their allies at the Battle of Chester. The Northumbrians had the victory and allegedly slaughtered a large number of monks nearby who had prayed for a British victory. The Northumbrians were then able to take control of the area north of the River Trent. The Britons (i.e. the Welsh), supported by the Mercians, then attempted to regain control of the area from the Northumbrians. This resulted in a war which took place up and down Ryknield Street, Ermine Street and lesser known north–south Roman routes. These roads gave entry, respectively, to Northumbria from the south and to Mercia from the north.

The series of battles and sieges was recorded in the Historia Brittonum (History of the Britons). Earlier, in a more incoherent way, some of the battles had been noted from the Northumbrian viewpoint by the Venerable Bede in his Historia ecclesiastica gentis Anglorum (Ecclesiastical History of the English People).

== Battle sites and episodes ==
- 616: Battle of Chester – A Northumbrian victory, the British and Mercian army defeated. Recent archaeological work at Heronbridge near Chester has identified the battle site.
- 633: Battle of Hatfield Chase – A Northumbrian army was defeated by an alliance of Mercia and Gwynedd, and Edwin of Northumbria was killed. There are two possible locations which lay claim for this battle site. Either Hatfield Chase near Doncaster, near where a small former Roman fort at Kirk Sandall guards the south bank of the Don; or Hatfield near Cuckney in Nottinghamshire, near a former Roman camp at Gleadthorpe.
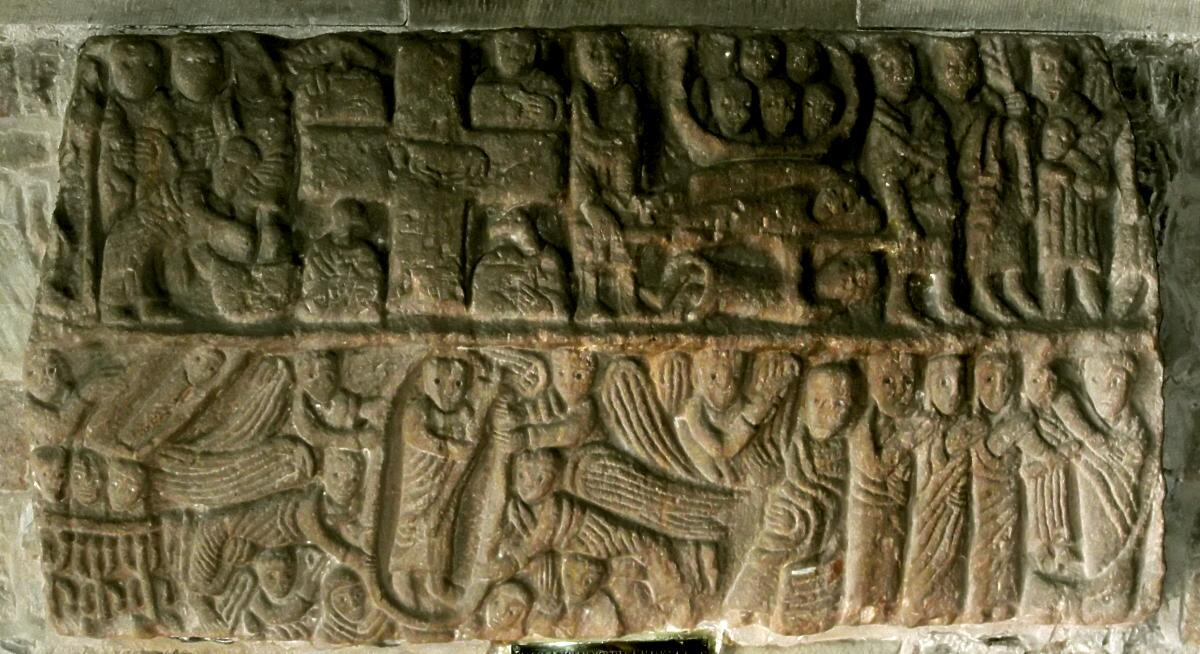
  Wirksworth Stone, a sarcophagus lid of Northumbrian sculpture
- 636: Morfael, a British leader, attacked Caer Llwydgoed (Old Welsh Cair Luit Coit, probably Wirksworth) and killed a bishop during the battle.
- 642: Battle of Maserfield (also known as the battle of Maes Cogwy or The Battle of Aberford) in which Oswald of Northumbria was defeated by Penda of Mercia. The battle took place where the western branch of Ermine Street crosses the Cock Beck at the Aberford Dykes (ancient fortifications).
- 655: The siege of Urbs Iudeu at which King Oswiu of Northumbria was compelled to buy off Penda of Mercia and Cadafael of Gwynedd by "delivering all the treasures which were in the city into the hands of Penda, and Penda distributed them to the Kings of the British, this is called the Restitution of Iudeu".
- 655: Battle of the Winwaed (Maes Gai) – Penda continued attempts to eject the Northumbrians, building to this November battle. Penda was killed and the Mercians and Britons defeated. Oswiu of Northumbria then set up Peada as 'King' of Mercia under Northumbrian control. It was said of the battle that the river rose in flood and as many were killed by drowning as in the battle.
- 657–674: The Mercian nobility rebel, kill Peada and make Wulfhere king of Mercia. In 670, Oswiu dies and is succeeded by his son Ecgfrith as King of Northumbria. In 674, Wulfhere dies and is replaced by Æthelred as King of Mercia.
- 679: Battle of the Trent – The Northumbrians are wholly defeated by the Mercians at an unknown site near the River Trent.

== Outcomes and legacy ==
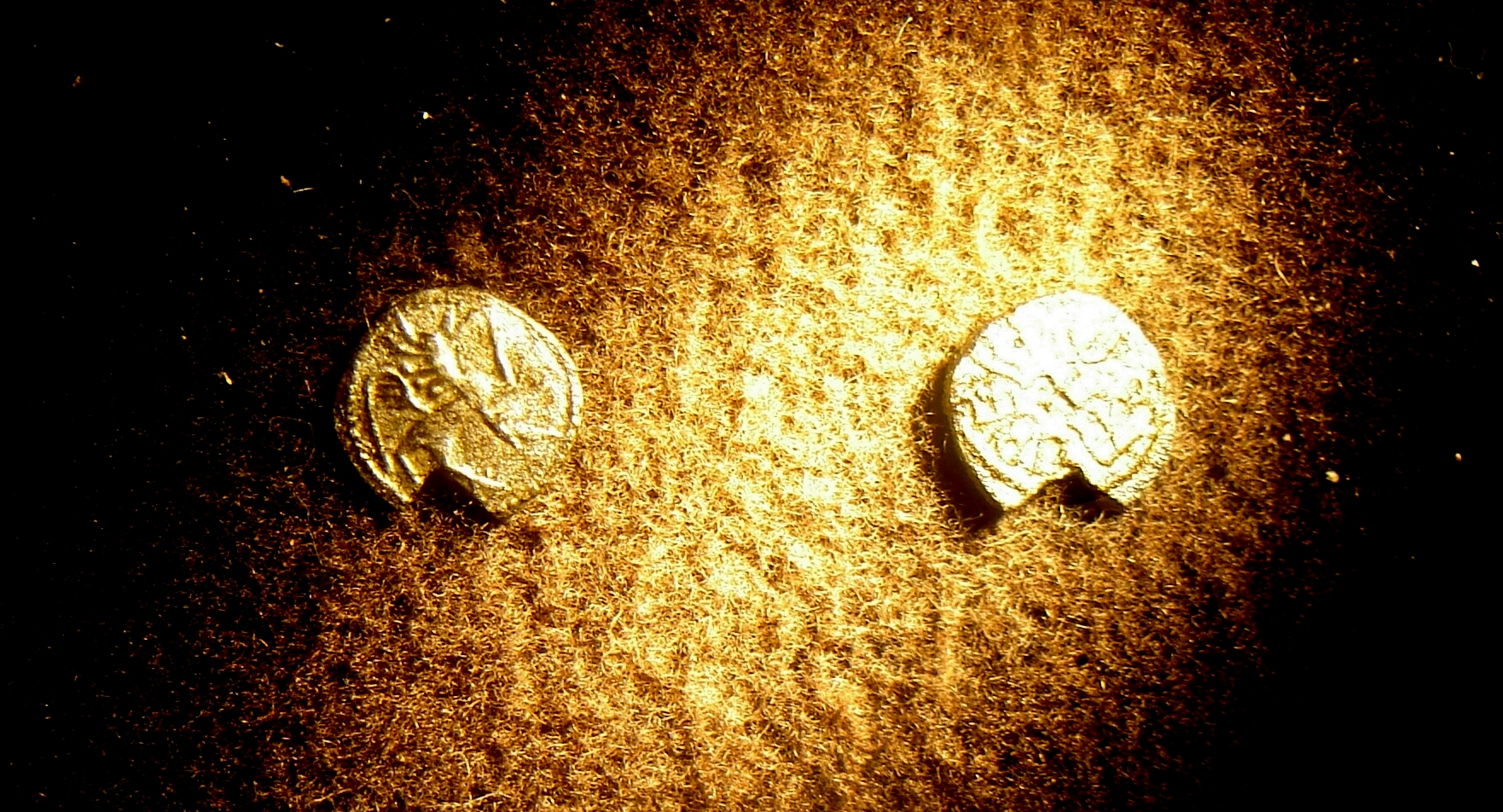
The Wirksworth Sceatt, a Northumbrian coin from the reign of King Eadberht, found at an archaeological dig in the town in 1986

The battles of the Northumbrian–Mercian war resulted from Northumbrian attempts to expand their kingdom, which originally comprised the provinces of Deira and Bernicia, including all the region north of the River Trent and in close proximity to it. This destroyed British supremacy in "the old North" and resulted in the war. Its eventual outcome and legacy, however, was the development and expansion of the Mercian kingdom beyond its original focal point in the Trent Valley around Tamworth and Repton. After the Battle of the Trent in 679, the border between Mercia and Northumbria appears to have been settled, with the provinces of Elmet and Heathfield becoming part of Northumbria and the provinces of The Peak District and Lindsey becoming part of Mercia. The Britons appear to retire quietly to Wales and, at least at the start of the Mercian kingdom, relations between the Mercians and the Welsh were of equal respect.

== See also ==
- List of Anglo-Welsh wars

== Bibliography ==
- Bede, 731AD, Ecclesiastical History of the English People, Book 3 accessed at Fordham University on http://www.fordham.edu/halsall/sbook.html
- Brady L, 2017, Writing the Welsh Borderlands in Anglo-Saxon England, Manchester, Manchester University Press, p 40
- Brooks N, 1989, “The formation of the Mercian Kingdom” in Bassett S, The origins of Anglo-Saxon Kingdoms, London, Leicester University Press, pp 158-170
- Brooks N, 2000, “Anglo-Saxon Myths: State and Church 400-1066”, London, Hambledon press, pp 69-77
- Collins R, 1999, Early Mediaeval Europe 300-1000, Basingstoke, MacMillan, pp 186-195
- Foot S, 1993, “The Kingdom of Lindsey” in Pre-Viking Lindsey, Lincoln, City of Lincoln Archaeological Unit, pp 128-140
- Gelling M, 1992, The West Midlands in the Early Middle Ages, Leicester, Leicester University Press, pp 94-100, pp 125-145
- Giles JA, 2000, History of the Britons by Nennius, Cambridge, In parentheses Publications, p 28.
- Grigg E, 2015, Early Medieval Dykes (400 to 850 AD), Thesis Phd, University of Manchester, p 271
- Halsall P, 1998, Annales Cambriae 447-954, accessed at Fordham University on http://www.fordham.edu/halsall/source/annalescambriae.html
- Jebson T, 2006, The Anglo Saxon Chronicle, Manuscript E (The “Peterborough”) Bodleian Library MS Laud 636, accessed at http://asc.jebbo.co.uk/e/e-L.html
- Mathews K, 2006, Marwnad Cynddylan (The death of Cynddylan), section 8, accessed at http://www.kmatthews.org.uk/history/texts.html
- Welch M in Brown MP and Farr CA, 2001, Mercia, London, Leicester University Press, p153
- Yorke B, 1990, Kings and Kingdoms of early Anglo-Saxon England, London, Routledge, pp 100-127
- Zaluckyj S, 2001, Mercia: The Anglo-Saxon Kingdom of Central England, Almeley, Logaston Press, pp 28-30, p35
