= Cadafael, King of Gwynedd =

King of Gwynedd from 634 to c. 655

Cadafael (Welsh: Cadafael Cadomedd ap Cynfeddw or Cadafael ap Cynfeddw; meaning "Cadafael, son of Cynfedd") was King of Gwynedd (reigned 634 – c. 655). He came to the throne when his predecessor, King Cadwallon ap Cadfan, was killed in battle, and his primary notability is in having gained the disrespectful sobriquet Cadafael Cadomedd (fully translated into English: Battle-Seizer the Battle-Decliner).

Unusual for the era, King Cadafael was not a member of one of the leading families of Gwynedd. His name appears in the Welsh Triads as one of the "Three kings, who were of the sons of strangers" (sometimes referred to as the "Three Peasant Kings"), where he is identified as "Cadafael, son of Cynfeddw in Gwynedd".

Cadafael's reign was a critical time for the future of the Cymry (i.e., the Welsh and the Brythonic "Men of the North" taken together, exclusive of all others). There was an alliance of the Cymry with Penda of Mercia initially forged by Cadwallon ap Cadfan, and there was ongoing warfare against the then-ascendant Kingdom of Northumbria.

Though the alliance was effective and enjoyed several notable successes, it would end disastrously with the death of Penda and a Northumbrian supremacy both in the north and in the English Midlands. The kingdoms of Pengwern, Manaw Gododdin, Gododdin, and Rheged would be permanently obliterated. The kingdoms of Gwynedd, Powys, and Alt Clud would be diminished. The blame for it fell hardest on Cadafael's reputation.

== Background ==
When Cadafael's predecessor Cadwallon ap Cadfan came to the throne c. 625, the fortunes of the Kingdom of Gwynedd were at low ebb. Edwin of Northumbria was everywhere successful, having conquered and absorbed the Cymry of Elmet and decisively defeated the Welsh at Chester in 616. Edwin would launch a successful occupation of Lindsey in 625, and he invaded and defeated Wessex in 626. He would also invade and occupy Anglesey, besieging Cadwallon on Ynys Seiriol (English: Island of Saint Seiriol), off easternmost Anglesey, and forcing him to flee to Ireland.

When Cadwallon returned he was able to restore Gwynedd to a position of viability. This was largely accomplished through an alliance of the Welsh kings of Gwynedd, Powys and Pengwern with the ambitious Penda, king of Anglian Mercia, who like the Welsh was threatened by Edwin's successes. Together they would contest Northumbria's rise, and the alliance would ultimately defeat and kill Edwin in 633 at the Battle of Hatfield Chase (Welsh: Gwaith Meigen) near Doncaster in South Yorkshire. Northumbria was then split back into its separate predecessor kingdoms of Bernicia and Deira, and Cadwallon defeated and killed their new kings, Eanfrith of Bernicia and Osric of Deira, as well. Northumbria's core lands were then devastated.

Cadwallon's success had brought renewed hope for a bright future, but it was transitory. Eanfrith's Bernician successor Oswald would reunite Northumbria into one kingdom, leading off at the Battle of Heavenfield (Bellum Cantscaul in the Annales Cambriae) near Hexham in 634, where he defeated and killed Cadwallon.

== Cadafael's reign ==
Cadafael renewed Cadwallon's alliance with Penda and the other Welsh kings, and the wars against Northumbria continued in the north and the English Midlands. Sometime between 635 and 641 Penda defeated the Kingdom of East Anglia and killed King Egric. He would also kill Egric's successor Anna in 654, establishing himself as the dominant power in the region. The most significant action occurred at the Battle of Maserfield (Welsh: Maes Cogwy) in 642/644, assumed to be near Oswestry. There Penda and his Welsh allies defeated and killed Oswald.

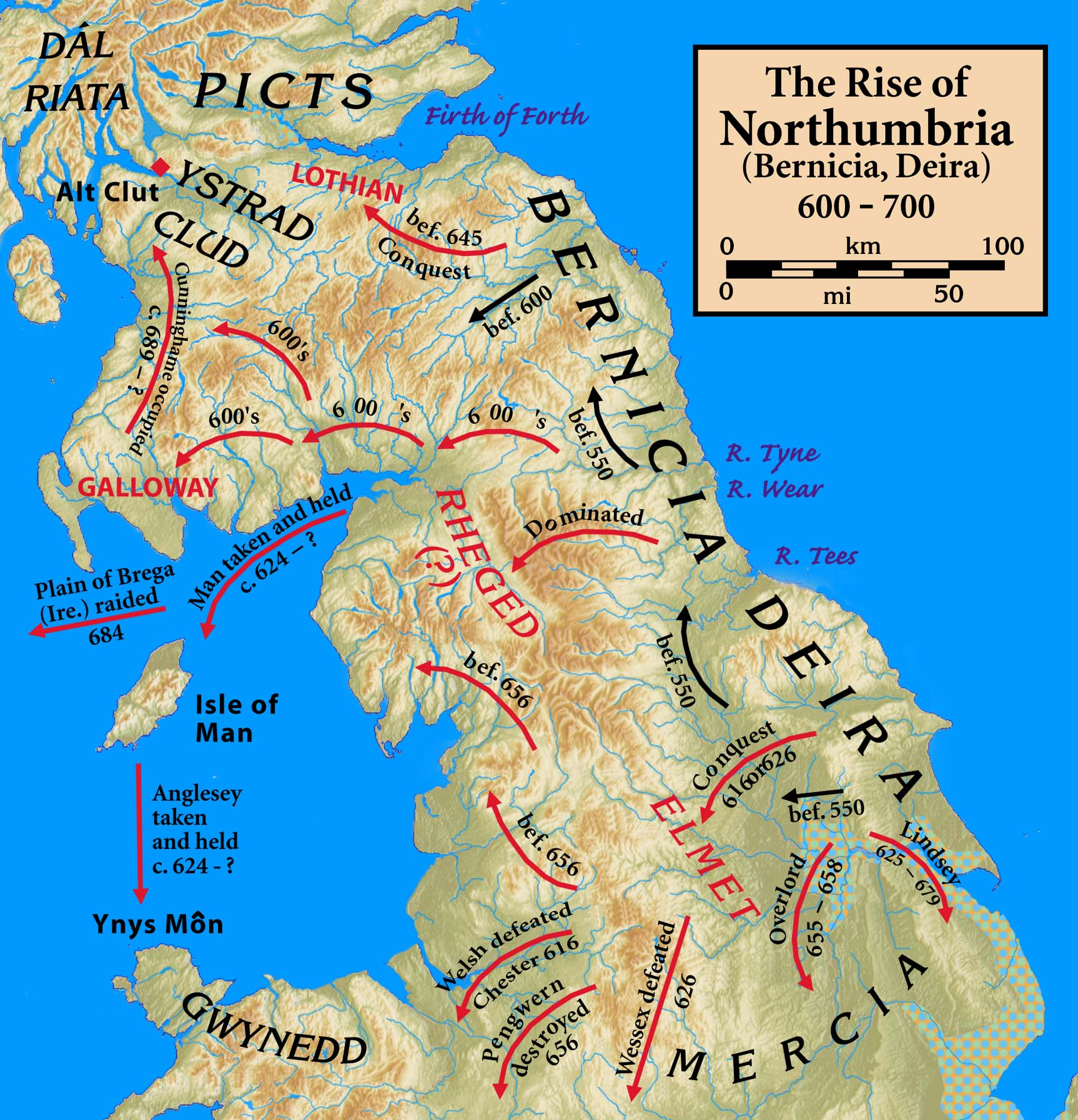

The wars went less well in the north. Northumbria secured the entire eastern coastal region of Lothian (i.e., Gododdin) in 638 or shortly thereafter, and there were battles against the men of Alt Clud (the Brythonic predecessor state of Strathclyde) in the 640s. While the outcome of these battles is not given in the historical record, most of what is now southern Scotland came under Northumbrian control, suggesting Northumbrian success. However, Penda and his alliance was still a major threat, and they besieged Oswald's Bernician successor Oswiu at his fortress of Bamburgh in 650 or 651, though they did not defeat him.

The defining moment came in 655 when Penda again led an alliance of Mercians, Welsh, Deirans, and East Anglians against Bernicia, besieging Oswiu at a stronghold somewhere in the north and compelling him to sue for peace. Having won this war at great cost, the members of the alliance returned south, the Welsh, in particular, pleased to have reclaimed items of dignity (the so-called "Restoration of Iudeu") taken from the kingdom of Gododdin or Manaw Gododdin by the Northumbrians.

However, while Oswiu had been beaten he had not been defeated. With many of its leaders having been killed in battle, the alliance was caught unawares in a sortie by Oswiu at the Winwaed (Welsh: Maes Gai, its location uncertain). Penda was killed, thus ending the alliance and ensuring a Bernician supremacy.

Oswiu quickly followed up his defeat of Penda by overrunning Mercia and launching a surprise assault on Pengwern's llys (English: royal court), killing King Cynddylan and virtually wiping out the entire royal family. Thereafter Pengwern disappears from the historical record, with some of its survivors moving westward to Mathrafal, and any who remained becoming part of a Mercian subkingdom.

== End of an epoch ==
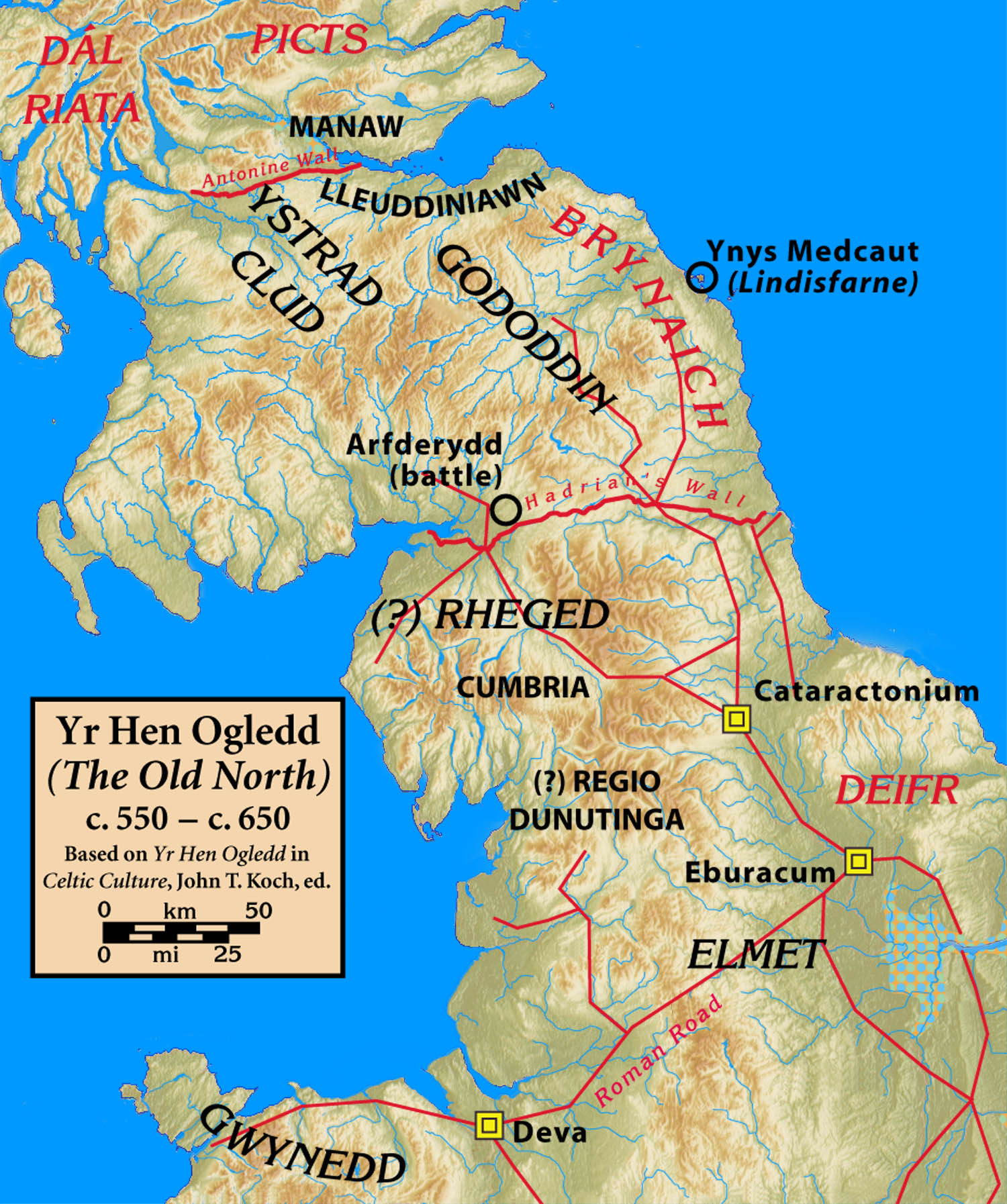

Oswiu would go on to re-unite Bernicia and Deira into Northumbria and establish a temporary dominance over Mercia, becoming the premier military and political power north of the Humber Estuary. Mercia would soon throw off the Northumbrian occupation and recover to become the premier military and political power in the English Midlands.

The future was much different for the Cymry of the Old North and North Wales. While Alt Clud would recover its independence and re-emerge as a state, the kingdoms of Manaw Gododdin, Gododdin, and Rheged were permanently destroyed and disappear from the historical record. Gwynedd would decline further until it would be unable to defend its own heartland from invasion and devastating raids, not to re-emerge as a regional power for 200 years. Powys was also weakened, and would not again become a military power until joined with Gwynedd under Rhodri the Great some 200 years later.

The death of Penda in 655 marks the end of the "heroic age" of the Welsh bards.

== Blame ==
It is not known when Cadafael's reign ended, but it is customary to assume that it must have been shortly after Penda's defeat. There is no contemporary account of the events, but writing some 180 years later Nennius would say that Cadafael had left for home the night before the battle, in his ally's hour of greatest need, implying it was a deliberate decision (i.e., by calling him the Battle-Decliner). It is unlikely that Cadafael would have been chosen king, or would have reigned so long, or that Penda would have engaged in a 20-year alliance with him, had this been his character.

In the medieval Welsh Triads, the death of King Iago ap Beli is described as the result of an axe-blow by one of his own men, a certain Cadafael Wyllt (English: Cadafael the Wild). In his Celtic Britain, John Rhŷs notes that the Annals of Tigernach mention Iago's death and use the word dormitat (or dormitato, meaning sleep in the sense of a euphemism for death), contradicting the notion of a violent death.

In the Dialogue between Myrddin and his sister Gwenddydd (Welsh: Cyfoesi Myrddin a Gwenddydd ei Chwaer) of the Red Book of Hergest, a succession of future kings is given in a prophecy, listing them correctly up to Cadwallon ap Cadfan, but then omitting Cadafael and listing Cadwallon's son Cadwaladr ap Cadwallon as following his father on the throne.

Whether deserved or not, disaffection for Cadafael and his name seems to have been genuine. An American contributor to an 1874 publication, in an article on Welsh names, noted that "Cadafael is still a name of opprobrium", adding that he was unaware of the reason.

== Sources ==
- Bates, Cadwallader J. (1897), "Winwedfield: The Overthrow of English Paganism", Archaeologia Aeliana, vol. XIX, London: Society of Antiquaries of Newcastle-Upon-Tyne (published 1898), pp. 182–190
- Davies, John (1990), A History of Wales (First ed.), London: Penguin Group (published 1993), ISBN 0-7139-9098-8
- Lloyd, John Edward (1911), A History of Wales from the Earliest Times to the Edwardian Conquest, vol. I (2nd ed.), London: Longmans, Green, and Co. (published 1912)
- Phillimore, Egerton, ed. (1887), "Pedigrees from Jesus College MS. 20", Y Cymmrodor, vol. VIII, Honourable Society of Cymmrodorion, pp. 77–92
- Phillimore, Egerton (1888), "The Annales Cambriae and Old Welsh Genealogies, from Harleian MS. 3859", in Phillimore, Egerton (ed.), Y Cymmrodor, vol. IX, Honourable Society of Cymmrodorion, pp. 141–183
- Rhys, John (1904), Celtic Britain (3rd ed.), London: Society for Promoting Christian Knowledge
- Skene, William Forbes (1868a), The Four Ancient Books of Wales, vol. I, Edinburgh: Edmonston and Douglas (published 1868)
- Skene, William Forbes (1868b), The Four Ancient Books of Wales, vol. II, Edinburgh: Edmonston and Douglas (published 1868)
- Stephens, Thomas (8 August 1851), "The Poems of Taliesin, No. III", Archaeologia Cambrensis, New Series, No. VIII, vol. II, London: The Cambrian Archaeological Society (published October 1851), pp. 261–274

Regnal titles
Preceded by Cadwallon ap Cadfan	King of Gwynedd; 634 – c. 655	Succeeded by Cadwaladr
