= Cyndrwyn =

King of Powys

Cyndrwyn was a King of Powys associated with Pengwern. Unlike many kings from Brittonic post-Roman Britain, he does not appear in the early Welsh genealogies or other historical sources. The father of Cynddylan ap Cyndrwyn, Cyndrwyn seems to have been a chieftain in Powys.

== Historical context ==
Some understanding of the historical context in which Cyndrwyn must have lived is afforded by Bede's Historia ecclesiastica gentis Anglorum, the Historia Brittonum, and early Welsh genealogies. With the collapse of the Roman Empire and the invasion of the Saxons, the remains of the civitas of the Cornovii held on to their lands in the lowland border regions of Wales (Herefordshire and Shropshire). By the beginning of the seventh century King Cystennin was the dominant ruler in the Old North, while Cyndrwyn ruled Powys. He died before 642 when his sons (except for Gwion who was killed at the Battle of Chester c. 616), chief of whom was Cynddylan, who joined King Penda of Mercia in the defeat of King Oswald of Northumbria at the Battle of Maes Cogwy, traditionally said to have occurred near Oswestry but may instead have been at Forden in Powys.

== Children ==
According to genealogies, he had numerous children consisting of fourteen sons, including his successor Cynddylan, and nine daughters, including Heledd ferch Cyndrwyn for whom the Canu Heledd is named.
