= Cynddylan =

Seventh century Welsh ruler

Cynddylan (Modern Welsh pronunciation: /kən'ðəlan/), or Cynddylan ap Cyndrwyn was a seventh-century Prince of Powys associated with Pengwern. Cynddylan is attested only in literary sources: unlike many kings from Brittonic post-Roman Britain, he does not appear in the early Welsh genealogies or other historical sources. The son of King Cyndrwyn, Cynddylan is described in the probably seventh-century poem Marwnad Cynddylan (Elegy for Cynddylan) and seems to have been a chieftain in Powys.

== Historical context ==
Some understanding of the historical context in which Cynddylan must have lived is afforded by Bede's Historia ecclesiastica gentis Anglorum, the Historia Brittonum, and early Welsh genealogies. With the collapse of the Roman Empire and the invasion of the Saxons, the remains of the civitas of the Cornovii held on to their lands in the lowland border regions of Wales (Herefordshire and Shropshire). By the beginning of the seventh century King Cystennin was the dominant ruler in the Old North, while Cynddylan's father, King Cyndrwyn "the Stubborn", ruled Powys. Cyndrwyn died before 642 when his sons (except for Gwion who was probably killed at the Battle of Chester c. 616), chief of whom was Cynddylan, joined Penda of Mercia in the defeat of King Oswald of Northumbria at the Battle of Maserfelth (Welsh: Maes Cogwy), traditionally said to have occurred near Oswestry but may instead have been at Forden in Powys.

It seems clear both from the poems and from a wider context of known alliances that Cynddylan worked, at least at key points in his career, in alliance with the kings of Mercia: Cadwallon ap Cadfan (d. 634) was allied with Mercia in 633; the Mercian king Penda seems to have lost partly because of the defection of a Welsh ally, Cadafael Cadomedd ap Cynfeddw (d. c. 655). The Marwnad Cynddylan certainly mentions Cynddylan aiding Penda (l. 28).

However, neither the occasion of Cynddylan's assistance to Penda nor of Cynddylan's death is known. Known possible battles include Penda's defeat of Oswald of Northumbria at Maserfelth/Maes Cogwy: a stray verse appended to Canu Heledd in the manuscript National Library of Wales 4973 claims that 'Cynddylan was a helper' at this battle. The Battle of the Winwaed (654/55), in which Oswiu defeated and killed Penda, is a popular suggestion for the battle in which Cynddylan died. But Marwnad Cynddylan also refers (in lines 42–62) to a major fight near Lichfield, in Mercian territory, otherwise unknown but sometimes imagined to have taken place after Penda's death. Marwnad Cynddylan makes it clear that the Cadelling, the dynasty descending from Cadell Ddyrnllwg, were rivals to Cynddylan.

The later and less reliable Canu Heledd suggest that Cynddylan died defending Powys from English invaders at a place called Tren, generally understood as the River Tern in Shropshire.

== Sources and their value ==
As mentioned, Cynddylan is attested only through literary sources.

=== Marwnad Cynddylan ===
The key source for Cynddylan is the lament for his death known as Marwnad Cynddylan (Elegy for Cynddylan). Marwnad Cynddylan is a seventy- or seventy-one-line awdl-poem (not to be confused with the englyn-poem of the same name in Canu Heledd). It is generally thought to have originated at around the time of Cynddylan's death. Strikingly, it is actually addressed not to a king of Powys, Cynddylan's home, but of Dogfeiling, a sub-kingdom of Gwynedd near to Rhuthun in the middle of Denbighshire, based in Aberffraw, which suggests a rather complex political context for its composition.

The poem is first attested in the manuscript National Library of Wales 4973, pp. 108a-109b, a manuscript of ancient poetry compiled by Dr John Davies of Mallwyd around 1631–34. Other early copies (Panton 14 and British Library, Add. MS. 14867) derived from Davies's. Davies's copy includes a variety of old spellings consistent with the thirteenth-century conventions attested in the Black Book of Carmarthen, but the orthography is mostly modernised, not always accurately, making the poem particularly tricky to interpret.

Editions and translations include:

- Joseph P. Clancy, The Earliest Welsh Poetry (London: Macmillan, 1970), pp. 87–89.
- R. Geraint Gruffydd, 'Marwnad Cynddylan', in Bardos, ed. by R. Geriant Gruffydd (Cardiff: Gwasg Prifysgol Cymru, 1982), pp. 10–23 (major edition, with modern Welsh translation)
- Thomas Jones and Jim Gould, ‘Letocetum: The Name of the Roman Settlement at Wall, Staffs.’, Transactions of the Lichfield and South Staffordshire Archaeological and Historical Society, 5 (1963–64), 51-54 (translation).
- Jenny Rowland, Early Welsh Saga Poetry: A Study and Edition of the ‘Englynion’ (Cambridge: Brewer, 1990), pp. 174–89 (edition and translation)
- Ifor Williams, 'Marwnad Cynddylan', Bulletin of the Board of Celtic Studies, 6 (1932), 134-41 (edition, with manuscript orthography)
- Ifor Williams, Canu Llywarch Hen, 2nd edn (Cardiff, 1953), pp. 50–52 (edition, with modernized orthography)
- Wikisource edition

=== Canu Heledd ===
Canu Heledd (Song of Heledd) is in the narratorial voice of Cynddylan's sister Heledd, the sole surviving member of the House of Powys. This cycle of englynion takes the form of Princess Heledd lamenting the destruction of her home and the death of her family (including her brothers, one of whom was Cynddylan, her sister Ffreuer and the royal court), at the hands of the English. Most scholars date Canu Heledd to the ninth century, but they may well be representative of earlier works in the oral tradition which are now lost. The cycle includes another Marwnad Cynddylan, not to be confused with the more famous and probably more historically reliable awdl poem of the same name. While some historians have taken the cycle as reliable evidence for events in the sixth century, it is now thought to be a reimagining of historical people and places which owes much more to the political situation of its time of composition. This is even more the case for the somewhat overlapping cycle Canu Llywarch Hen.
