= Battle of the Winwaed =

655 battle between Mercia and Bernicia

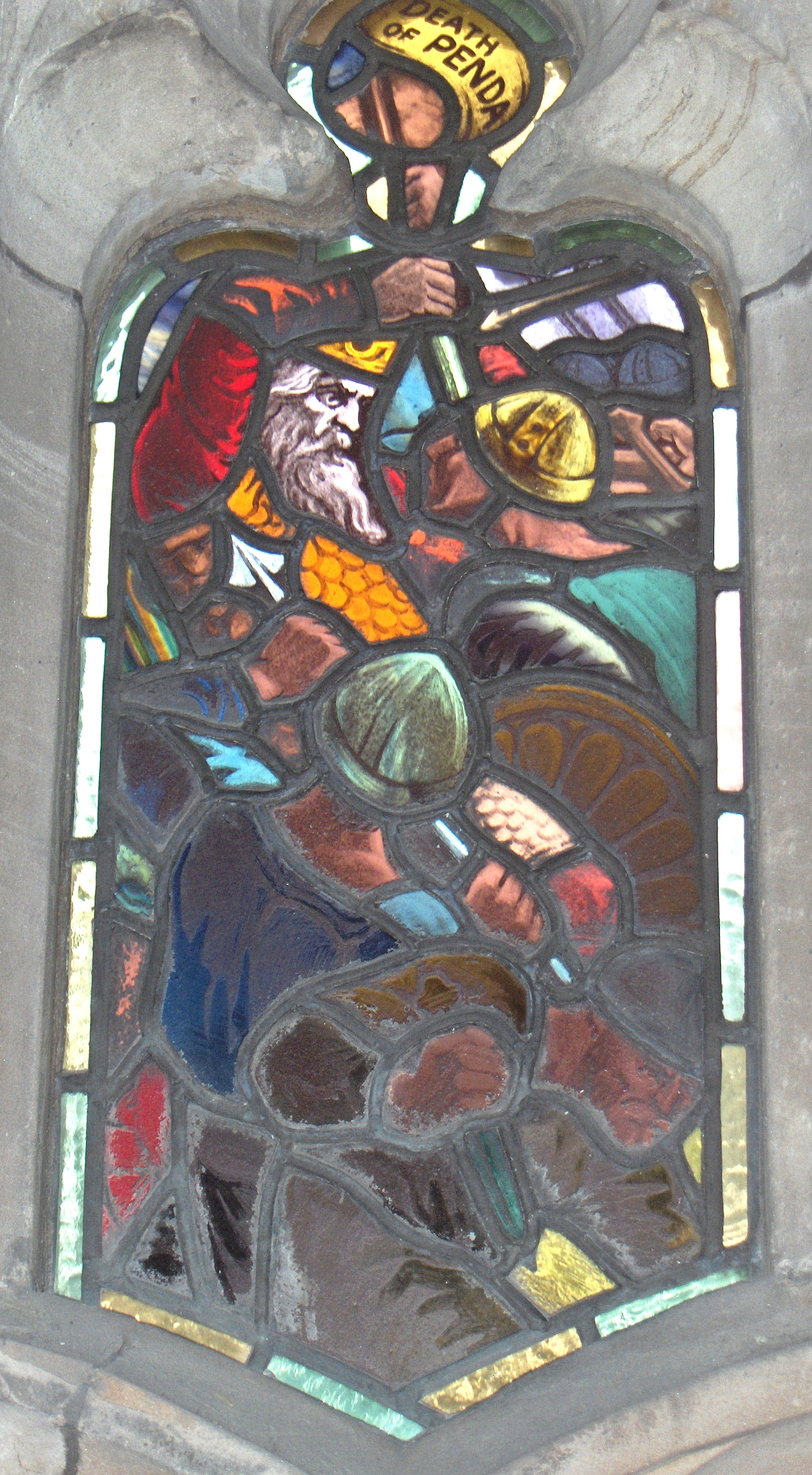
- Stained glass window from the cloister of Worcester Cathedral showing the death of Penda of Mercia
Date	15 November 655 AD
Location	Possibly the Cock Beck in present-day Yorkshire
Result	Northumbrian victory

Belligerents
Northumbrian Kingdom of Bernicia	Kingdom of Mercia; Kingdom of East Anglia

Commanders and leaders
King Oswiu of Bernicia	King Penda of Mercia †; King Æthelhere †

Strength
800 Bernician forces	1,400 Mercian forces 800 East Anglian forces

Casualties and losses
500 killed	450 killed in battle, 500 drowned

The Battle of the Winwaed was fought on 15 November 655 (Note: Manuscript A of the Anglo-Saxon Chronicle gives the year as 655. Bede also gives the year as 655 and specifies a date, 15 November. R. L. Poole (Studies in Chronology and History, 1934) put forward the theory that Bede began his year in September, and consequently November 655 would actually fall in 654; Frank Stenton also dated events accordingly in his Anglo-Saxon England (1943). Others have accepted Bede's given dates as meaning what they appear to mean, considering Bede's year to have begun on 25 December or 1 January. The historian D. P. Kirby suggested the year 656 as a possibility, alongside 655, in case the dates given by Bede are off by one year. The Annales Cambriae gives the year as 657.) between King Penda of Mercia and Oswiu of Bernicia, ending in the Mercians' defeat and Penda's death. According to Bede, the battle marked the effective demise of Anglo-Saxon paganism.

== Background ==
The roots of the battle lay in Penda's success in dominating England through a number of military victories, most significantly over the previously dominant Northumbrians. In alliance with Cadwallon ap Cadfan of Gwynedd he had defeated and killed Edwin of Northumbria at Hatfield Chase in 633, and subsequently he defeated and killed Oswald of Northumbria at the Battle of Maserfield in 642. Maserfield effectively marked the overthrow of Northumbrian supremacy, and in the years that followed the Mercians apparently campaigned into Bernicia, besieging Bamburgh at one point; the Northumbrian sub-kingdom of Deira supported Penda during his 655 invasion.

== Toponymy, location, and date ==
Since the 19th century, winwœd or winwæd was interpreted as an Old English name, from the elements winnan or win ("strife", "fight") and wæd ("shallow water", "ford"). In 2004, however, Andrew Breeze reinterpreted the name with a Celtic etymology, corresponding to Modern Welsh gwenwedd ('whiteness'). Meanwhile, the campus Gai (Latin) or maes Gai (Welsh) of the Welsh sources means 'Caius's field'.

Although the battle is said to be the most important between the early northern and southern divisions of the Anglo-Saxons in Britain, few details are available. The two armies met near a river named the "Winwæd", but this river has never been identified. Since, after the battle, Oswiu concludes his campaign in the district of Loidis (which gives its name to the modern West Yorkshire city of Leeds), the Winwæd is usually thought to have been near Leeds and/or a tributary of the Humber. Andrew Breeze argued for the River Went, a tributary of the River Don, situated to the north of modern-day Doncaster. Other identifications include the river now known as Cock Beck, Leeds (which has inspired the modern housing estate name Pendas Fields), before joining the River Wharfe (which eventually feeds into the Humber). Wilder speculations include Oswestry or Winwick.

After his account of the battle and the monastic endowments made by Oswiu in thanks to God for his victory, Bede says that

King Oswiu brought the campaign to a close in the district of Loidis on 15 November in the thirteenth year of his reign, to the great benefit of both peoples; for he freed his own subjects from the hostile devastations of the heathen people and converted the Mercians and the neighbouring kingdoms to a state of grace in the Christian faith, having destroyed their heathen ruler.

This has traditionally been seen as evidence that the Battle of the Winwæd itself took place on 15 November 655, but Philip Dunshea has argued that Bede's phrasing makes it possible that the battle could have happened some time—even years—before Oswiu 'brought the campaign to a close', and that its location could have been far from Leeds.

== Battle ==
Penda, after gathering allies from East Anglia and Wales, marched with a force led by "thirty warlords". Oswiu, who was Oswald's brother but had succeeded him only in Bernicia, the northern part of Northumbria, was besieged by Penda's forces at a place called Urbs Iudeu (which has been identified, perhaps dubiously, with Stirling) in the north of his kingdom. Iedeu appears as a historic name for Jedburgh, also located in the north of the kingdom. Apparently Oswiu was desperate enough to offer a great deal of treasure to Penda in exchange for peace. Although the sources are unclear, it is likely that some sort of agreement was reached at Iudeu: although Bede says that Oswiu's offers of treasure were rejected by Penda, who, Bede says, was determined to destroy Oswiu's people "from the highest to the lowest", he does mention that Oswiu's young son Ecgfrith was being held hostage by the Mercians, perhaps as part of a deal.

The Historia Brittonum contradicts Bede regarding the treasure, saying that Penda distributed it among his British allies, which would presumably mean that he accepted it. The recorded events may be interpreted to mean that Penda and his army then began marching home, but for some reason the two armies met and fought at a place called the River Winwaed. Breeze argues that Penda and his army would have been in a difficult strategic location along the Went during their withdrawal, giving Oswiu a good opportunity to attack.

It is almost certain that the small (perparvus, according to Bede) Northumbrian forces were considerably outnumbered by the Mercians and their allies. According to Bede, before the battle Oswiu prayed to God and promised to make his daughter a nun and grant twelve estates for the construction of monasteries if he was victorious.

Penda's army was apparently weakened by desertions. According to the Historia Brittonum, Penda's ally Cadafael ap Cynfeddw of Gwynedd (thereafter remembered as Cadomedd, "battle-shirker") abandoned him, along with his army, and Bede says that Aethelwald of Deira withdrew from the battle to await the outcome from a place of safety. Penda was soundly defeated, and both he and his ally, the East Anglian King Aethelhere, were killed, with thirty allied leaders of warbands (duces regii). The battle was fought by the river in the midst of heavy rains, and Bede says that "many more were drowned in the flight than destroyed by the sword". Bede mentions that Penda's head was cut off. Writing in the 12th century, Henry of Huntingdon expanded his version of Bede's text to include supernatural intervention and remarked that Penda, in dying violently on the battlefield, was suffering the same fate he had inflicted on others during his aggressive reign.

== Aftermath ==
The battle had a substantial effect on the relative positions of Northumbria and Mercia. Mercia's position of dominance, established after the battle of Maserfield, was destroyed, and Northumbrian dominance was restored; Mercia itself was divided, with the northern part being taken by Oswiu outright and the southern part going to Penda's Christian son Peada, who had married into the Bernician royal line (although Peada survived only until his murder in 656). Northumbrian authority over Mercia was overthrown within a few years, however.

Significantly, the battle marked the effective demise of Anglo-Saxon paganism; Charles Plummer, in 1896, described it as "decisive as to the religious destiny of the English". Penda had continued in his traditional paganism despite the widespread conversions of Anglo-Saxon monarchs to Christianity, and a number of Christian kings had suffered death in defeat against him; after Penda's death, Mercia was converted, and all the kings who ruled thereafter (including Penda's sons Peada, Wulfhere and Æthelred) were Christian.
