= Heledd ferch Cyndrwyn =

7th-century princess of the Kingdom of Powys

- Father: Cyndrwyn
- Relatives: Cynddylan (brother)

Heledd ferch Cyndrwyn was a mid-seventh-century princess of the Kingdom of Powys. She was the first major female character named in Welsh literature. She was the sister of Cynddylan and the narrator in the Canu Heledd poems.

She was the only survivor of an attack by an English group, possibly Mercians, on the royal family of Pengwern. The Canu Heledd poems are a eulogy to her brother's death and a lament to the devastation of their kingdom.

The name 'Heledd' means a saline pool or estuary. It is one of the oldest Welsh-language names.

== Canu Heledd ==
Canu Heledd is in Heledd's narratorial voice. This cycle of englynion takes the form of Princess Heledd lamenting the destruction of her home and the death of her family at the hands of the English. Most scholars date the poems to the ninth century, but they may well be representative of earlier works in the oral tradition which are now lost. The cycle includes another Marwnad Cynddylan, not to be confused with the more famous and probably more historically reliable awdl poem of the same name. While some historians have taken the cycle as reliable evidence for events in the sixth century, it is often thought to be a reimagining of historical people and places which owes much more to the political situation of its time of composition.
