= Heronbridge Roman Site =

Historical site in Cheshire, England

Coordinates: 53.1691°N 2.8829°W

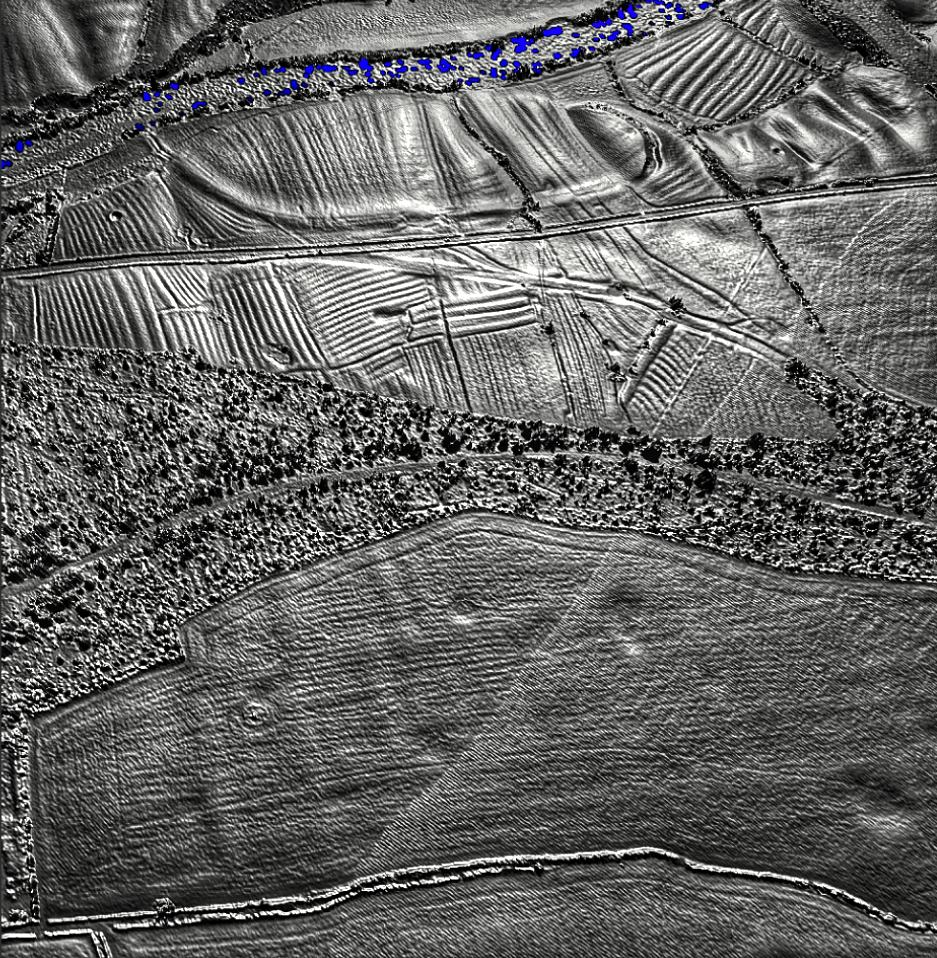
A lidar view of Heronbridge Roman settlement

Heronbridge Roman Site is the remains of a Roman settlement on both sides of Watling Street, about 2 kilometres (1.2 mi) south of Chester in Cheshire, England, with evidence of industrial activity (furnaces) in the late 1st and 2nd centuries. The site is a Scheduled Ancient Monument.

== Site investigation ==
The site was found by chance by a member of Chester Archaeological Society in 1929. It lies in undeveloped land, offering the prospect of a site undisturbed in modern times, with much scope for investigators. Excavations took place in 1930–31 and found human remains with evidence of violent deaths. Further investigations took place in 2003–04, and the site was also a target of the archaeological television programme Time Team in 2005. In the 2010s about a dozen skeletons from the 1930–31 excavation were re-identified in the collections of the Manchester Museum, the majority exhibiting severe trauma injuries. Carbon-dating of two further skeletons, uncovered in 2004, is consistent with a date of death in the early 7th century.

== Roman occupation ==
The settlement was founded on the west bank of the River Dee in the late 1st century AD. It became a significant settlement, with many established stone buildings and a quayside cut into the bedrock. There are also indications of a river bridge in the area, and evidence of trade in coal (dated to about AD 200) has been found at the inland port.

After Roman occupation ended, around AD 350, the town decayed into ruin.

== Post-Roman ==
Overlying part of the Roman town's site, between Watling Street and the river, is an enclosure. It is believed to be an Anglo-Saxon military encampment thrown up after the Battle of Chester (AD 611 according to the Irish Annals). The earthwork was reinforced by masonry recovered from the Roman ruins. Archaeological excavations have uncovered a post-Roman mass grave beneath the defensive earthwork, which may hold Northumbrian casualties of the Battle of Chester. The battle was an Anglian victory by King Aethelfrith of Northumbria over a Welsh army.

There are three alternative explanations for the earthwork enclosure, however. One is that it was built by Norse-Irish settlers led by Ingimundr, who established themselves near Chester about AD 905 and subsequently tried to capture the city. Second, D-shaped defensive compounds sited beside rivers, such as the Heronsgate earthwork, are a recognised feature of the Viking Age. Third, it could have been constructed very much later, perhaps being one of the positions set up during the Siege of Chester by Parliamentary forces in 1644.
