= Pengwern =

Settlement in sub-Roman Britain

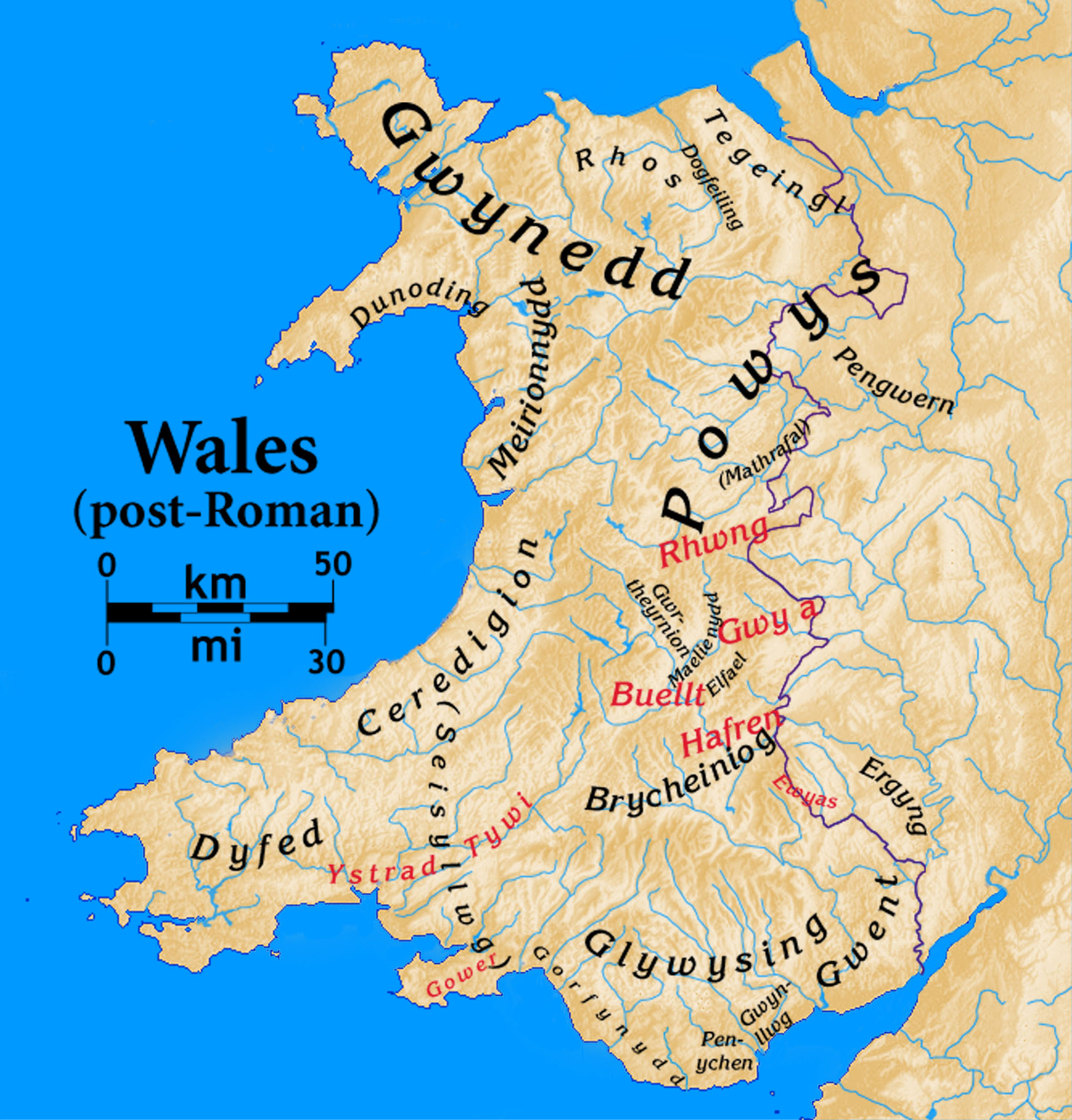
Post-Roman Welsh kingdoms or tribes. The modern border between Wales and England is shown in purple.

Pengwern was a Brythonic settlement of sub-Roman Britain situated in what is now the English county of Shropshire, adjoining the modern Welsh border. It is possibly the early seat of the kings of Powys (Llys Pengwern), such as with King Cyndrwyn Fawr and his son Cynddylan ap Cyndrwyn in the 6th and 7th Century, before its establishment at Mathrafal, further west, but the theory that it was an early kingdom (or a sub-kingdom of Powys itself) has also been postulated. Its precise location is uncertain, but likely included at least Shrewsbury (Amwythig), and reached to the River Tern, and the hills around such as the Wrekin (Dinlle Wrecon).

== Possible locations ==
A number of places still identifiable in the Shropshire landscape today are mentioned alongside Pengwern in this poetry. The exact location of Llys Pengwern – the Court of Pengwern – is not known, and the problem is compounded by the fact that several other Pengwerns exist in Wales (including one near Denbigh in north Wales). A tradition, recorded by Giraldus Cambrensis in the late 12th century, associates it with the site of modern Shrewsbury (although that town has been known as Amwythig in Welsh since the Middle Ages).

A more recent suggestion is the Berth, a dramatic hillfort at Baschurch, is the location of Pengwern. However, archaeological evidence shows only the Iron Age fort with possible Roman reuse. Wroxeter, the former Roman town of Viroconium Cornoviorum, is near these places. Archaeological evidence suggests that the settlement at Wroxeter continued after the Roman withdrawal, and was only finally abandoned in about 520, when it had become indefensible as the last vestiges of Romano-British central government broke down. A fort on the Wrekin, near Wroxeter, has also been suggested for this reason. Another theory is that the earthworks under Whittington Castle may be Pengwern. Its precise location is uncertain.

== History and legend ==
=== Origins ===
Nothing is known about the foundation of Pengwern, although according to Welsh tradition it was part of the Welsh Kingdom of Powys in the early Middle Ages. Early Powys, much larger in extent than the later medieval kingdom, seems to have roughly coincided with the territory of the Celtic Cornovii tribe, whose civitas under Roman rule (capital or administrative centre) was Viroconium Cornoviorum (now Wroxeter), replacing a fort located on the Wrekin, which was abandoned. Once the Roman legions left the area, Viroconium Cornoviorum had taken control of governing. However, the surrounding pagus (possibly multiple) may have revolted against the rule of Viroconium Cornoviorum, establishing a separate centre of power, which would become Powys. Between 530 and 550, Viroconium Cornoviorum, like many other Roman urban sites and villas in Britain at the time, was abandoned, possibly eventually developing into part of the royal court of Llys Pengwern. The site of Pengwern was listed as one of the three ancient capitals of Wales by Gerald of Wales, alongside Aberffraw in Gwynedd and Dinefwr in Deheubarth.

The earliest known member of the regional dynasty of Pengwern was King Cyndrwyn, according to genealogies, he had numerous children consisting of fourteen sons, including his successor Cynddylan ap Cyndrwyn, and nine daughters. The exploits of Cynddylan, as imagined around the 9th century, are told in the Old Welsh Canu Heledd (transl. Song of Heledd), a cycle of poems named after Cynddylan's sister, Heledd ferch Cyndrwyn, possibly dating from the 9th century but not recorded until later, and this material situates Cynddylan's seat at Pengwern. The poems may be representative of an earlier oral tradition. These relate to a further cycle of heroic and elegiac poetry concerning early Powys and the Hen Ogledd known as Canu Llywarch Hen. His story is also told in the Marwnad Cynddylan (transl. Elegy for Cynddylan), a seventy or seventy-one-line awdl-poem, generally thought to have originated at around the time of Cynddylan's death.

=== Conflict with Northumbria ===
In the 7th century, Cynddylan joined forces with King Penda of Mercia to protect his realm against the Anglian kingdom of Northumbria, also possibly being motivated with personal reasons as his brother Gwion ap Cyndrwyn had been killed during the Battle of Chester in 616 in which fellow ally King Selyf ap Cynan of Powys died as well along with King Iago ap Beli of Gwynedd. It is unclear what happened to Powys afterwards, as mentions of their rulers became scarce for nearly a century. Together Cynddylan and Penda fought against the increasingly powerful Northumbria at the Battle of Maes Cogwy (transl. Battle of Maserfield) in either Oswestry or Forden in 642. It was here that their mutual enemy, King Oswald of Northumbria, was slain. Later, a raiding party led by Moriael ap Cyndrwyn, a brother of Cynddylan, attacked Lichfield, where he captured 1,500 cattle and 80 stallions with harnesses. A chief bishop and the monks of the monastery in Lichfield were present but unable to provide any protection against the attackers. After this there seems to have been a period of peace until Penda's death, when a Northumbrian raiding party led by Oswald's brother Oswiu of Northumbria overran northern Mercia and, a bit later, Cynddylan's court at Llys Pengwern in a surprise attack. The royal family, including the king, were slaughtered while fighting back against the attackers at the River Tern. According to the poetry commemorating the tragedy, the palace was burnt to the ground, likely along with records after it was left undefended by the royals fighting at the Tern. The corpses of the royal family were described by the Canu Heledd as being desecrated by eagles. The king was later buried in Baschurch, before it too was burnt down by the English attackers. Heledd was the only survivor of the destruction of Llys Pengwern, and she fled to western Powys, lamenting that the burning was her fault. After the destruction of the royal court, the region associated with Pengwern seems to have been shared between Mercia and Powys; part of it remained in Welsh hands until the reign of Offa of Mercia and the construction of his dyke. Part of it consisted of the Anglian sub-kingdom of the Magonsæte and Wreocensæte.

== Later usage ==
In Shrewsbury, there is the Pengwern Boat Club on the banks of the River Severn, opposite The Quarry park, as well as an independent bookshop on Fish Street called Pengwern Books.

== Sources and their value ==
=== Marwnad Cynddylan ===
The main source for Cynddylan is the lament for his death known as Marwnad Cynddylan. It is addressed not to a king of Powys or Pengwern, but of Dogfeiling, a sub-kingdom of Gwynedd near Rhuthun in the middle of Denbighshire, based in Aberffraw, which suggests a rather complex political context for its composition.

The poem is first attested in the manuscript National Library of Wales 4973, pp. 108a-109b, a manuscript of ancient poetry compiled by Dr. John Davies of Mallwyd around 1631–34. Other early copies (Panton 14 and British Library, Add. MS. 14867) derived from Davies's. Davies's copy includes a variety of old spellings consistent with the thirteenth-century conventions attested in the Black Book of Carmarthen, but the orthography is mostly modernised, not always accurately, making the poem particularly tricky to interpret.

=== Canu Heledd ===
Canu Heledd is in the narratorial voice of Cynddylan's sister Heledd. This cycle of englynion takes the form of Princess Heledd lamenting the destruction of her home and the death of her family at the hands of the English. The cycle includes another Marwnad Cynddylan, not to be confused with the more famous and probably more historically reliable awdl poem of the same name. While some historians have taken the cycle as reliable evidence for events in the sixth century, it is now thought to be a reimagining of historical people and places which owes much more to the political situation of its time of composition.
