= North Berwick Law =

Hill in East Lothian, Scotland

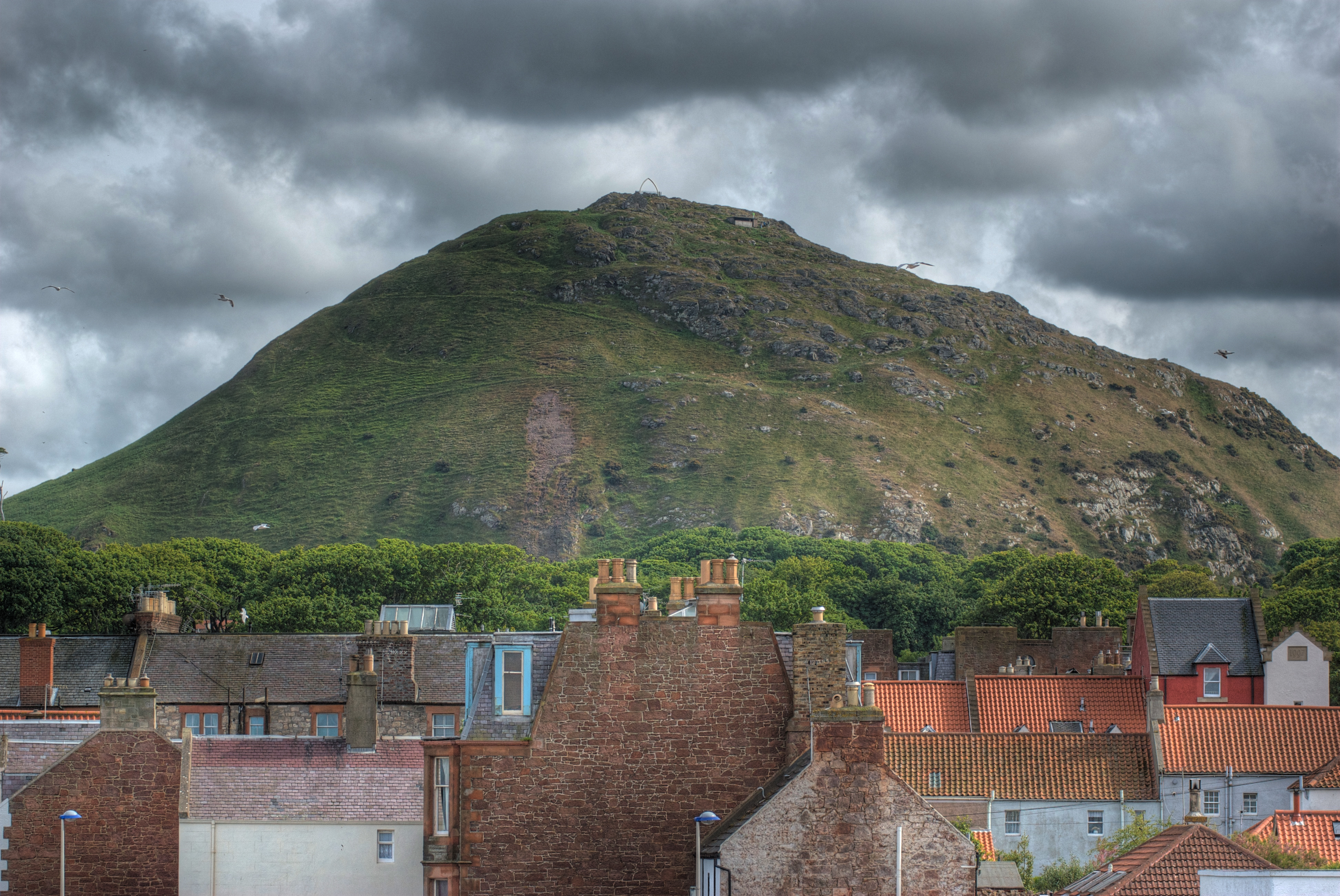
- North Berwick Law seen from the seafront of North Berwick

Highest point
- Elevation: 187 m (614 ft)
- Prominence: 168 m (551 ft)
- Isolation: 9.77 km (6.07 mi)
- Listing: Marilyn
- Coordinates: 56°02′55″N 2°42′57″W

Geography
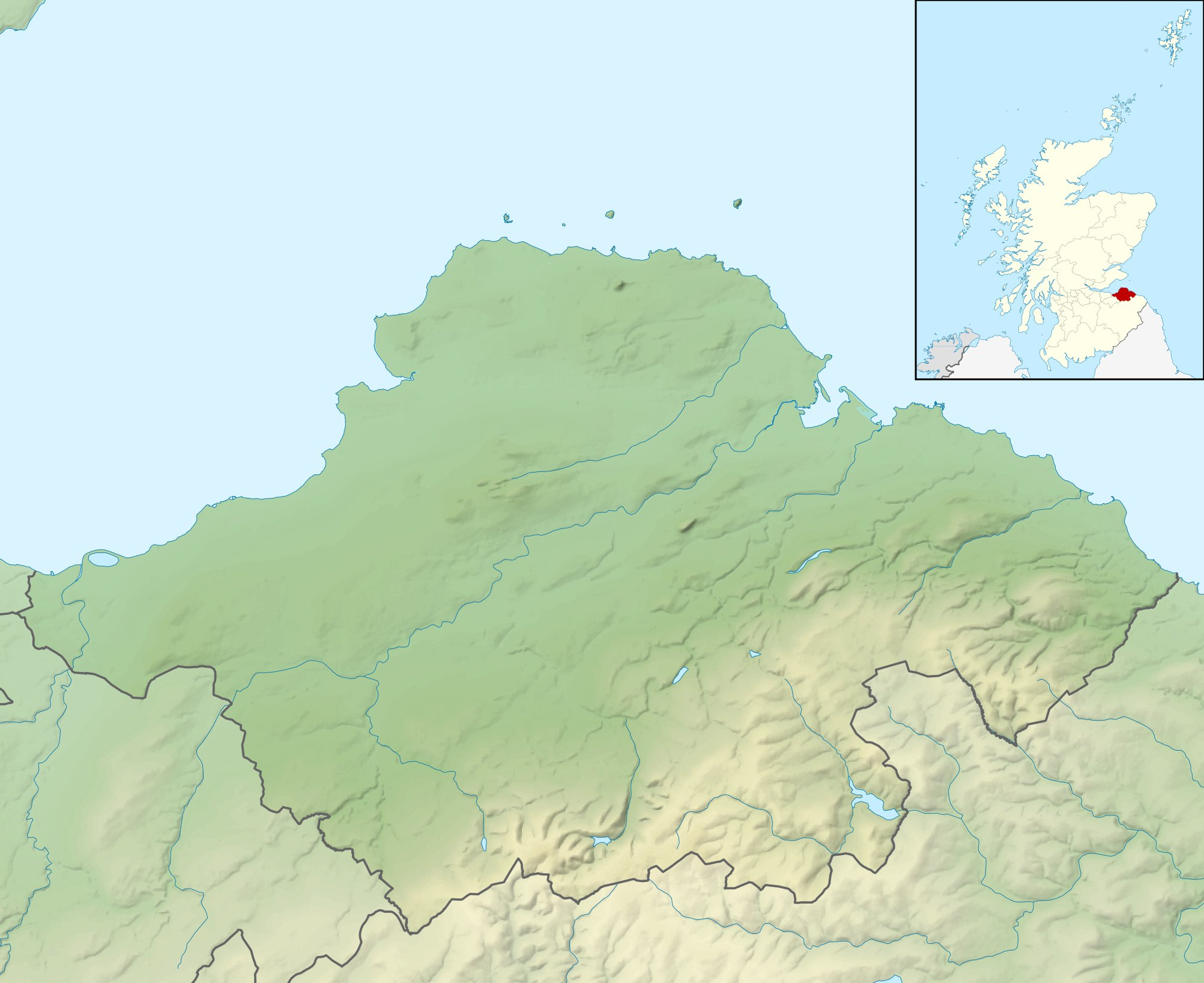
- Location within East Lothian
- Location: East Lothian, Scotland, United Kingdom
- OS grid: NT555842
- Topo map: OS Landranger 66

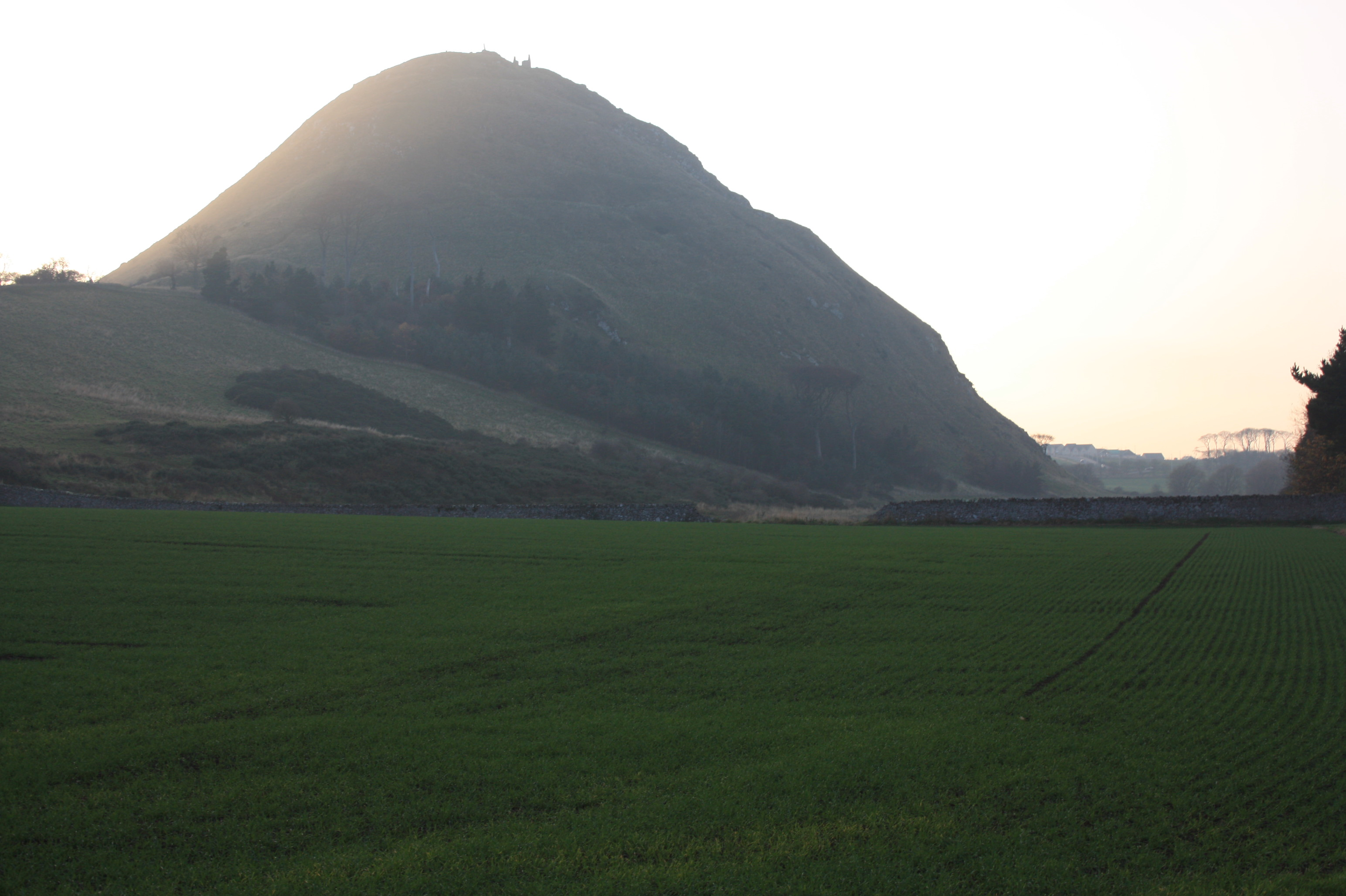
Berwick Law from the east

North Berwick Law, sometimes abbreviated to Berwick Law, is a conical hill which rises conspicuously from the surrounding landscape (this is the definition of the Lowland Scots word "law"). It overlooks the East Lothian town of North Berwick, Scotland, and stands at 613 ft (187 m) above sea level.

It is considerably steeper (1:1 gradient) on its north side.

== Geology ==
Geologically, the law is a volcanic plug of hard phonolitic trachyte rock of Carboniferous (Dinantian) age. It has survived the scraping glaciers of the ice age. It is a crag and tail with a prominent tail extending eastwards.

== History ==
The summit bears remnants of an Iron Age hill fort, and the ruins of later military buildings that were once used by lookouts in both the Napoleonic Wars, and in World War II.

Since 1709 the law has been topped with a whale's jawbone. The bone was replaced three times until being removed, due to safety concerns, in 2005. On 26 June 2008, a fibreglass replica whale bone, the same size as the one that was removed in 2005, was airlifted into place to give North Berwick Law back its landmark. The funding for the replica was donated by an anonymous friend of North Berwick.. A recent hypothesis places the location of Urbs Iudeu, at North Berwick Law, which was the place where in 655, King Oswiu of Northumbria surrendered huge amounts of treasure to Penda, king of Mercia, and that the name is associated with nearby Kingston Common.

== Access to the summit ==
The summit of the hill can be reached by a footpath starting from a car park located at the foot of the law. The round trip takes about one hour's walk. In order to reduce soil erosion it's warmly recommended to hikers not to leave the established path. The hill top, in clear weather, offers views of the Firth of Forth and of the nearby Bass Rock island.

== See also ==
- List of inselbergs
- List of mountains in Scotland

== Gallery ==
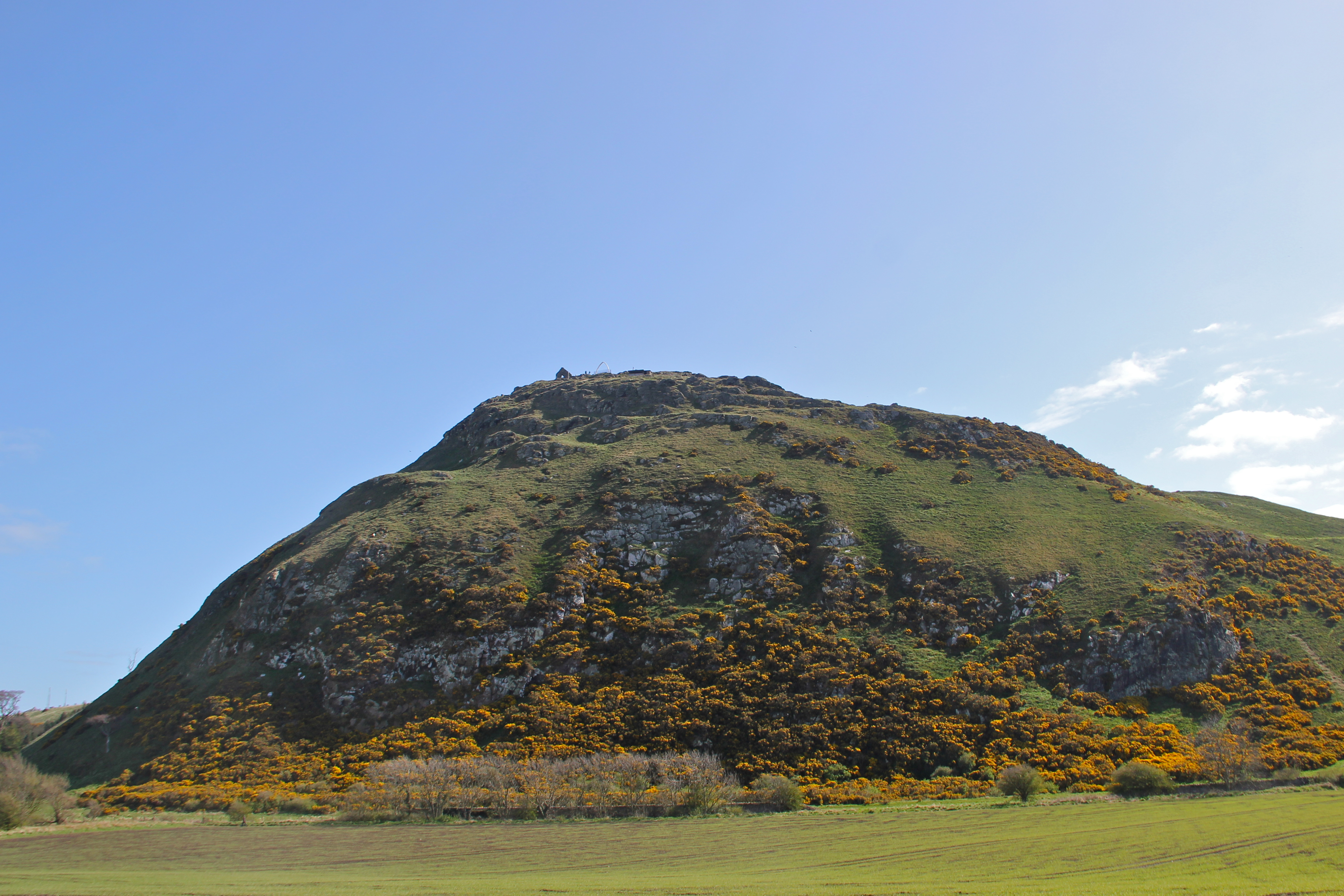
North Berwick Law, North Berwick, East Lothian

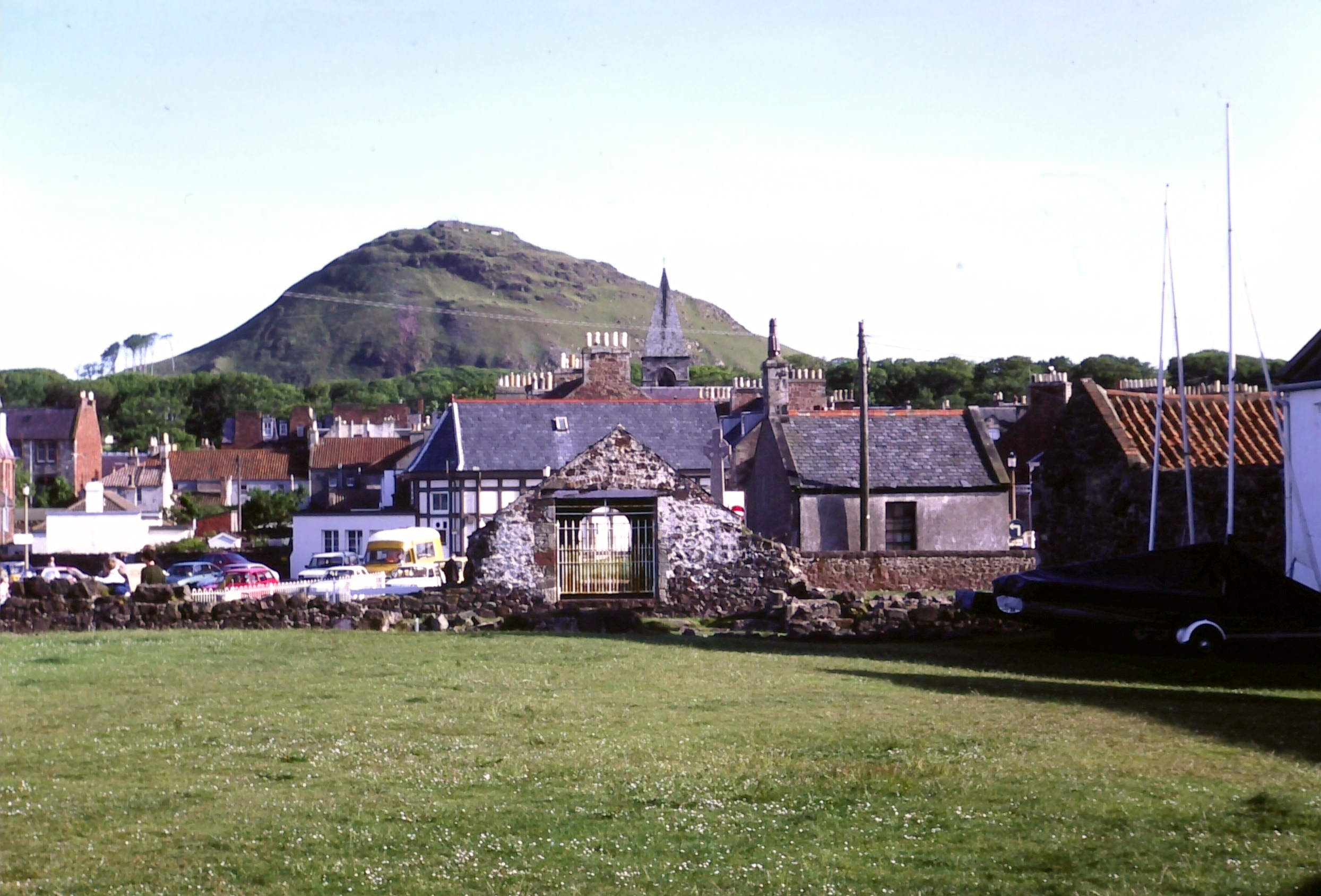
Berwick Law, seen from the town

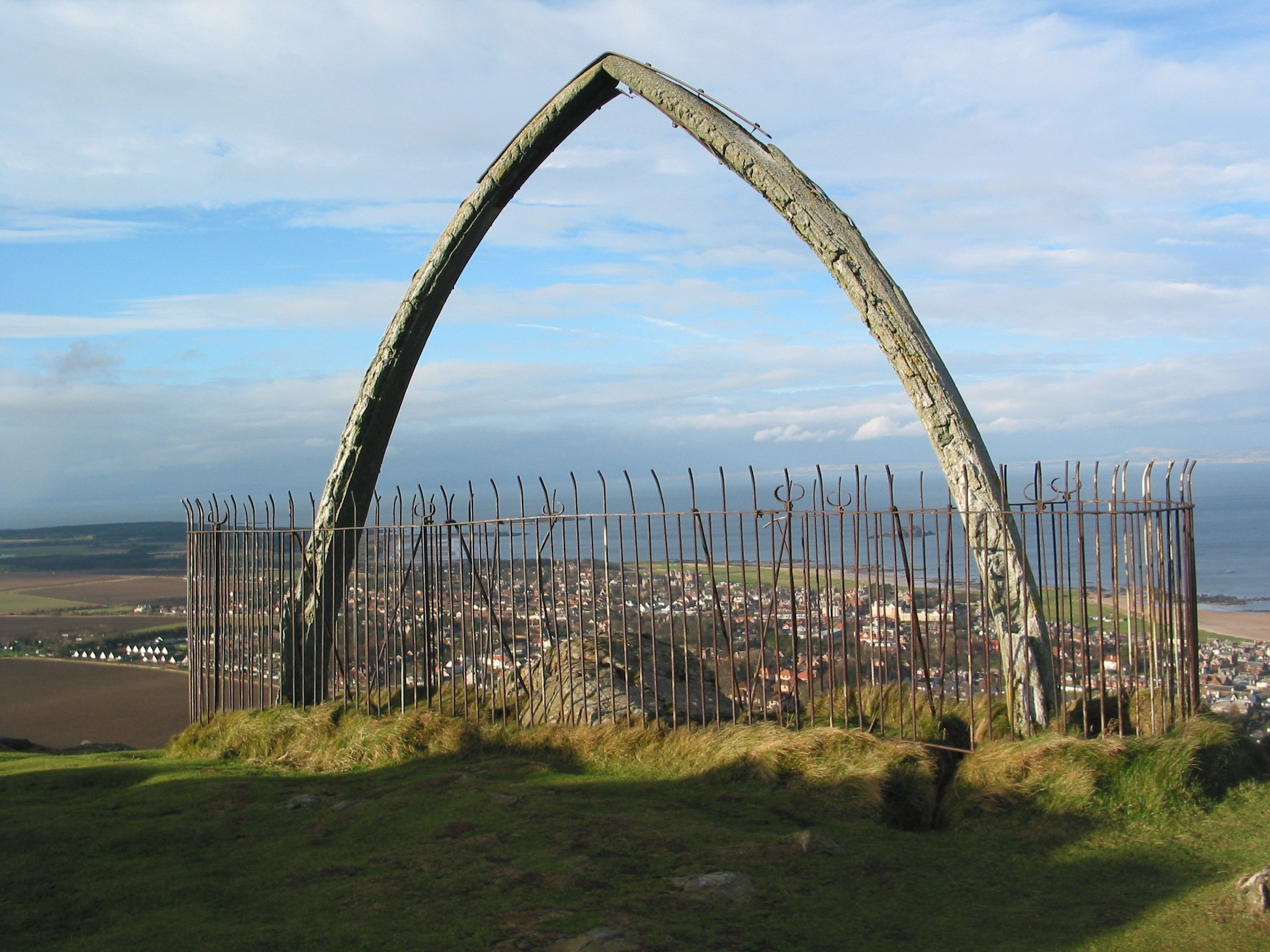
The whale's jawbone as it sat on top of North Berwick Law

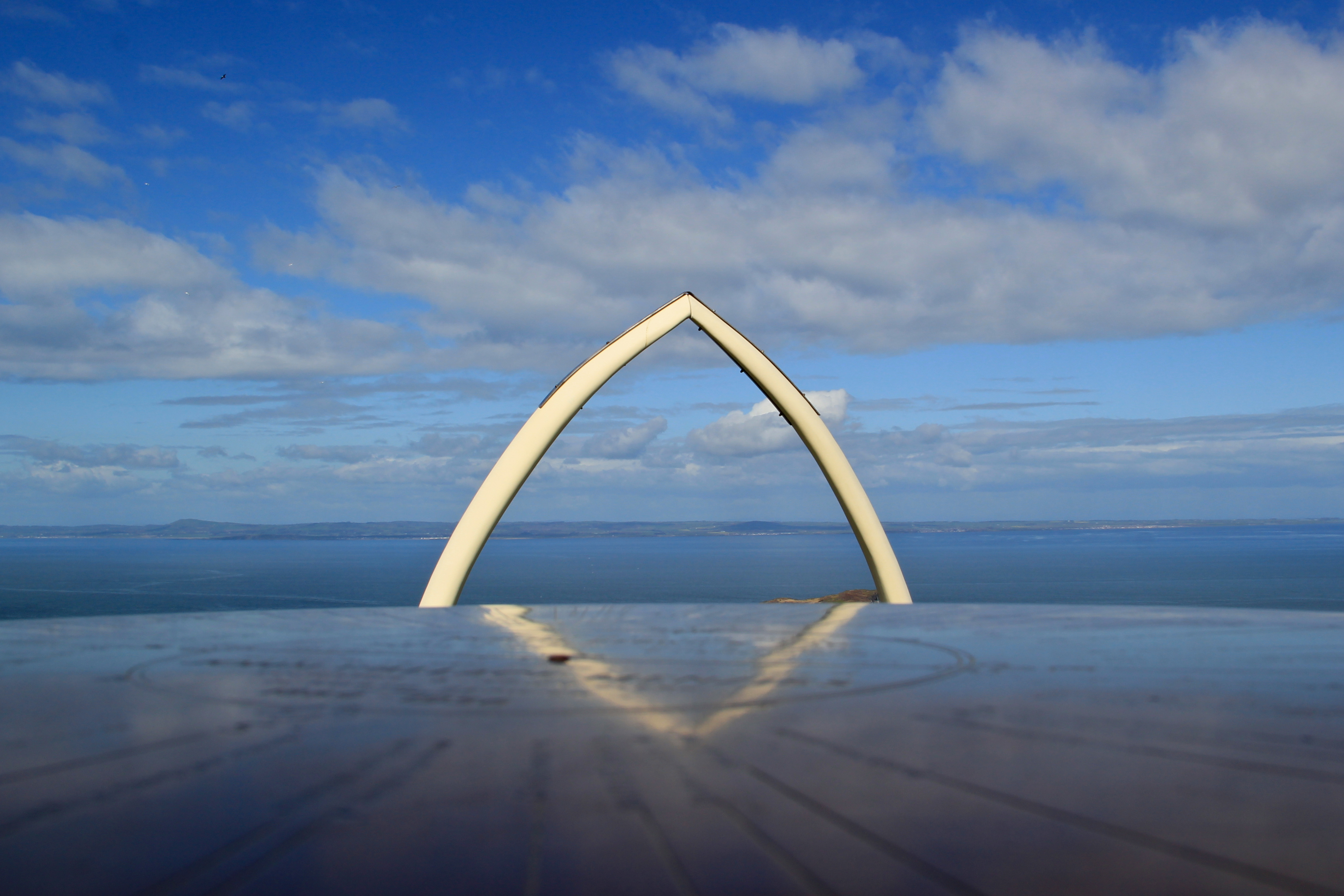
The replica of the original jawbone

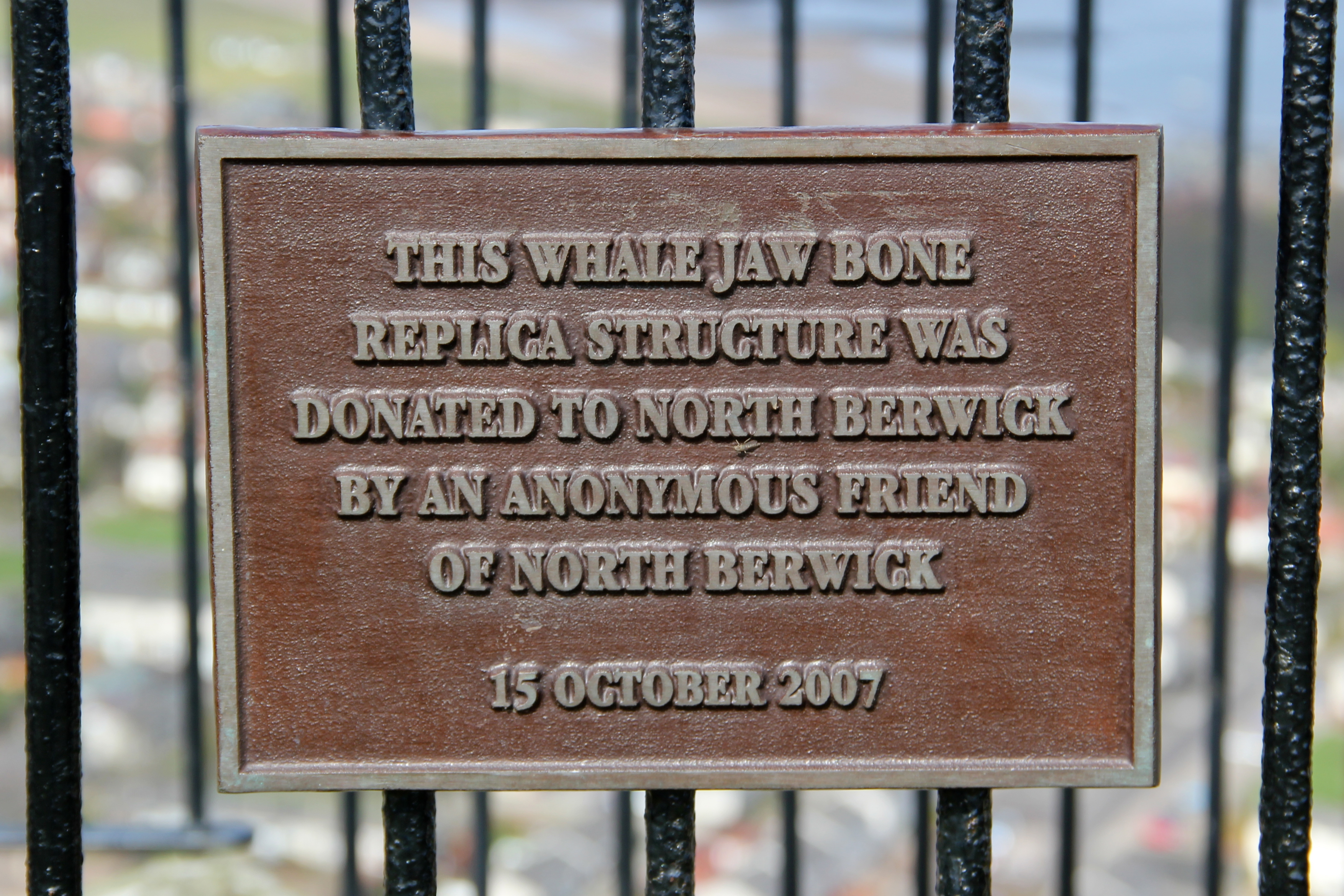
An anonymous friend of the town donated the replica jawbone

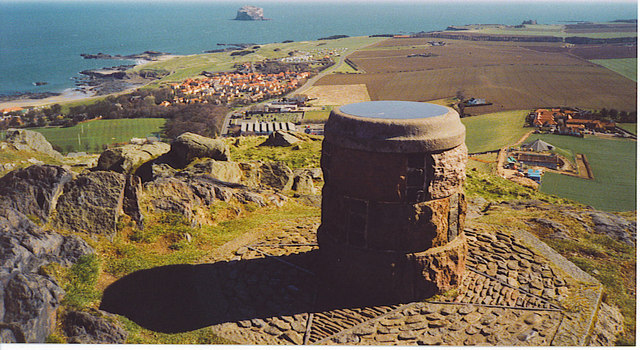
Viewpoint indicator on North Berwick Law, with the Bass Rock in the background
