= Canu Heledd =

Collection of early Welsh englyn-poems

Canu Heledd (modern Welsh /'kani 'hɛlɛð/, the songs of Heledd) are a collection of early Welsh englyn-poems. They are rare among medieval Welsh poems for being set in the mouth of a female character. One prominent figure in the poems is Heledd's dead brother Cynddylan.

== Summary ==
Dorothy Ann Bray summarised the cycle thus:

The entire cycle of the Heledd poems ... is a statement of mourning from which a background story has been deduced: Cynddylan, prince of Powys, and his brothers along with his heroic band are slain in battle, defending their country against the English in the mid-seventh century. Heledd, his sister, is one of the few survivors, who witnessed the battle and the destruction of Cynddylan's hall at Pengwern. She has lost not only all her brothers, but also her sisters and her home, and the poems suggest that she blames herself for the destruction of Cynddylan's court because of some ill-spoken words.

As with the other so-called 'saga englynion’ (pre-eminently Canu Llywarch Hen and Canu Urien), there is considerable uncertainty and debate as to how the poems of Canu Heledd might originally have been performed. It is usually assumed that they must have been accompanied by some kind of prose narrative, to which they provided emotional depth; but this is not certain.

== Contents ==
As edited by Jenny Rowland, the contents of Canu Heledd are as follows:

Title	Stanza nos	Summary
Prologue	1	An invitation to maidens to contemplate the destruction of Pengwern.
Marwnad Cynddylan	2–16	An elegy for the dead Cynddylan, not to be confused with the probably seventh-century awdl-poem of the same name.
A stray verse	17	On the burial of Cynddylan.
Stafell Gynddylan	18–33	A meditation on the abandoned hall of Cynddylan.
Eryr Eli	34–39	A meditation on the eagle of Eli (an unidentified place) and how he eats dead warriors.
Eryr Pengwern	40–44	A meditation on the eagle of Pengwern and how he eats dead warriors.
Eglywysau Basa	45–51	An elegy for the destroyed churches of Bassa.
Y Drefwen	52–56	A meditation on the past glories of the settlement Trefwen (probably Whittington).
Ffreuer	57–65	A lament for Heledd's dead sister Ffreuer.
Herding	66	An elliptical stanza on a cow.
On the Courses of Rivers	67–68	On the rivers Tren (now Tern), Trydonwy (probably the Roden), Twrch (possibly Afon Twrch), Marchnwy (conceivably the River Banwy), Alwen, and Geirw (now Ceirw, a tributary of the Alwen).
Newid Byd	69–72	Heledd laments her poverty.
Gorwynion	73–75	On Gorwynion's success in protecting his cattle from reavers.
Gyrthmyl	76	On the beavement of a warrior called Gyrthmyl.
Ercal	77	Describes how the descendants of one Morial are buried in Ercall (a region now in Shropshire, in which High Ercall is sited).
Heledd Hwyedig	78–79	Heledd laments her bereavement.
Gazing	80–81	Heledd surveys desolation.
Fragment	82	Too incomplete to summarise.
Heledd's Brothers	83–86	Heledd laments the loss of her brothers Cynan, Cynddylan, and Cynwraith.
Epigram	87	Though people have died, the furrows they ploughed remain.
Hedyn	88–89	A lament for someone called Hedyn.
The Boar's Den	90	An elliptical stanza on a boar's piglets.
Caranfael	91–97	An elegy for Caranfael, apparently a cousin or maybe brother of Cynddylan.
Heledd a'i Brawd Claf	98–101	Heledd laments the death of her brothers.
Beddau	102–103	A meditation on the graves of Heledd's brothers,
Tren	104–106	Heledd laments the power vacuum in the region of the River Tren.
Heledd's Sisters	107–109	Heledd laments the loss of her sisters Gwladus, Gwenddwyn, Ffreuer, Meddwyl, Meddlan, Gwledyr, Meisir, and Ceinfryd.
Cynddylan and Cynwraith	110	Heledd laments the deaths of Cynddylan and Cynwraith.
Maes Cogwy	111	A meditation on the dead on the field of the Battle of Cogwy, notable for its elaborate, bardic style.
Llemenig	112–113	Praise of one Llemenig mab Mawan, notable for its elaborate, bardic style.

== Manuscripts and dating ==
The poems are attested principally in the Red Book of Hergest, which was written between about 1382 and 1410. They were also included in the White Book of Rhydderch, but are now lost due to damage to the manuscript. However, they are attested in two later manuscripts descended from the White Book, Peniarth 111 (made by John Jones of Gellillyfdy in 1607), whose spelling is very close to the White Book's, and London, British Library, Add. MS 31055 (made by Thomas Wiliems in 1596), which is a less conservative copy. Some other late copies of lost medieval manuscripts of the englynion also exist: National Library of Wales 4973 contains two copies of the cycle, both copied by Dr John Davies of Mallwyd, one of Wales's leading antiquarians and scribes of his day, before 1631. The first copy, NLW 4973a, derives from a lost manuscript closer to the White Book than the Red. The second copy, NLW 4973b, is more complex and may represent a conflation of multiple medieval sources, but seems to have at least some independent value as a witness to the lost archetype of the poems. It is fairly clear that all these manuscripts descend from a lost common original, to which they are all fairly similar, making the creation of a critical edition of the poems relatively straightforward.

Despite surviving first in manuscripts written between about 1382 and 1410 and in largely Middle Welsh orthography, Canu Heledd are thought mostly to have been composed in Old Welsh and transmitted orally and/or in manuscript, due to their archaic style and occasionally archaic spelling: Jenny Rowland dates the cycle to c. 800–900.

== Historicity ==
Although neither Cynddylan nor Heledd are attested in historical sources such as the Harleian genealogies, Cynddylan is the subject of a lament in awdl-metre, Marwnad Cynddylan (not to be confused with the englynion of the same title in Canu Heledd), which is thought to date from the time of his death, and scholars have not doubted that Cynddylan and Heledd were historical figures in seventh-century Powys. However, while some scholars have thought of other details of Canu Heledd as also being good evidence for seventh-century events, other sources suggest that seventh-century relations between Mercia and Powys were more cordial, and that there was no catastrophic invasion of Powys by the English in this period. Such invasions did characterise the ninth century, however, when Canu Heledd was probably composed. Thus the poems are generally now thought more to reflect ninth-century imaginings of what the seventh century must have been like, telling us more about ninth-century realities than seventh-century ones. Some commentators even consider a tenth-century date for the origin of the text.

Heledd has been supposed by some commentators to have 'taken over the mantle of the old Celtic goddess of sovereignty', but there is no substantial evidence for this.

== Example ==
As edited and translated by Jenny Rowland, stanzas 57–65 of Canu Heledd, entitled 'Ffreuer', run:

Gwynn y byt freuer mor yw dihent. heno
gwedy colli kenueint.
o anffawt vyn tauawt yt lesseint.

Gwyn y byt freuer mor yw gwann heno.
gwedy agheu eluan.
ac eryr kyndrwyn kyndylan.

Nyt angheu ffreuer. am de heno
am danorth brodyrde.
duhunaf wylaf uore.

Nyt angheu ffreuer am gwna heint
o dechreu nos hyt deweint.
duhunaf wylaf bylgeint.

Nyt angheu ffreuer am tremyn heno.
am gwna grudyeu melyn.
a [choch] dagreu dros erchwyn.

Nyt angheu ffreuer a erniwaf heno
namyn my hun. [yn] wanglaf
vym brodyr am tymyr a gwynaf.

Ffreuer wenn brodyr ath uaeth.
ny hannoedynt or diffaeth.
wyr ny uegynt vygylaeth.

Ffreuer wenn brodyr ath uu.
pann glywynt gywrenin llu.
ny echyuydei ffyd ganthu.

Mi a ffreuer a medlan.
kyt ytuo cat ym bop mann.
nyn tawr ny ladawr an rann.

Translation:

Blessed is Ffreuer — how painful it is tonight
after the loss of family.
Because of the misfortune of my tongue they have been slain.

Blessed is Ffreuer — how sad it is tonight
after the death of Elfan
and the hero of Cyndrwyn, Cynddylan.

It is not the death of Ffreuer which torments me tonight.
Because of the ?slaughter of my ?ardent brothers
I wake, I weep at morning.

It is not the death of Ffreuer which causes me grief tonight
from the beginning of night till the dead of night.
I wake, I weep at daybreak.

It is not the death of Ffreuer which moved me tonight
and cayses me to have yellow cheeks
and (shed) tears of blood over the bedside.

It is not the death of Ffreuer which I grieve for tonight,
but rather for myself, weak and ill.
I mourn for my brothers and my land.

Ffreuer Wen, brothers nurtured you —
they did not spring from among the wicked —
warriors who did not nurse fear.

Ffreuer Wen, you had brothers.
When they heard of a powerful host
?faith did not leave them.

Myself and Ffreuer and Meddlan —
though there might be battle everywhere
it does not worry us — our side will not be killed.

== Appearances in popular culture ==
Heledd's reception in post-medieval texts has been surveyed by Marged Haycock. These include the novella Tywyll Heno by Kate Roberts.

== Editions and translations ==
- Ifor Williams, Canu Llywarch Hen, 2nd edn (Cardiff, 1953)
- Jenny Rowland, Early Welsh Saga Poetry: A Study and Edition of the 'Englynion’ (Cambridge: Brewer, 1990) (includes editions pp. 404–18 and translations pp. 468–76)
- Jenny Rowland, (ed.) A Selection of Early Welsh Saga Poems (London: Modern Humanities Research Association, 2014) (selected texts)
