= Iago ap Beli =

King of Gwynedd from c. 599 to c. 616

Iago ap Beli (c. 540 – c. 616) was King of Gwynedd (reigned c. 599 – c. 616). Little is known of him or his kingdom from this early era, with only a few anecdotal mentions of him in historical documents.

Iago ap Beli (Latin: Iacobus Belii filius; English: James son of Beli) was the son and successor of King Beli ap Rhun, and is listed in the royal genealogies of the Harleian genealogies and in Jesus College MS. 20. The only other record of him is the note of his death, which occurred in the same year as the Battle of Chester (Welsh: Gwaith Caer Lleon), with no connection between Iago's death and the famous battle, and with no evidence that Gwynedd had any part in the battle. He would be succeeded as king by his son, Cadfan ap Iago.

The 1766 publication of Henry Rowlands's Mona Antiqua Restaurata says that the archives of the cathedral at Bangor mention Iago as having founded a deanery there ("Iago ap Beli Rex Decanatu Ecclesiam ditavit"). However, the correctness of the archive's assertion is challenged in Haddan and William Stubbs' authoritative Councils and Ecclesiastical Documents Relating to Great Britain and Ireland, where it is noted that "the earliest historical testimony to a Dean at Bangor is 1162".

In the medieval Welsh Triads, the death of King Iago ap Beli is described as the result of an axe-blow by one of his own men, a certain Cadafael Wyllt (English: Cadafael the Wild). In his Celtic Britain, John Rhŷs notes that the Annals of Tigernach mention Iago's death and use the word dormitat (or dormitato, meaning sleep in the sense of a euphemism for death), contradicting the notion of a violent death. Further, as the word dormitato was generally used in reference to clerics, it is possible that Iago resigned his kingship and thereafter led a clerical life.

== Geoffrey of Monmouth ==
The largely fictional stories of ancient Britain written by Geoffrey of Monmouth use the names of many historical personages as characters, and the use of these names is a literary convenience made in order to advance the plot of Geoffrey's stories. One of these stories uses the names of Iago's son Cadfan and other contemporary people, telling of how a certain Edwin spent his exiled youth in Gwynedd, growing up alongside Iago's grandson, the future King Cadwallon. There is no historical basis for this story, as is readily acknowledged in the preface of works on the subject.

Nevertheless, a "traditional" story arose blending Geoffrey's fiction with known history, implying that the future King Edwin of Northumbria had actually spent his youth in Gwynedd, growing up alongside Iago's grandson, the future King Cadwallon. In point of fact, Cadwallon and Edwin were enemies with no known youthful connections: King Edwin invaded Gwynedd and drove King Cadwallon into exile, and it would be Cadwallon, in alliance with Penda of Mercia, who would ultimately defeat and kill Edwin in 633 at the Battle of Hatfield Chase (Welsh: Gwaith Meigen). The story that they had spent an idyllic youth together may have had a romantic appeal.

What is known from history is that in 588 King Ælla of Deira died, and Æthelfrith of Bernicia took the opportunity to invade and conquer Deira, driving Ælla 's 3-year old infant son, the future Edwin of Northumbria, into exile. Edwin would eventually ally himself with Rædwald of East Anglia in 616, defeating and killing Æthelfrith and becoming one of Northumbria's most successful kings. Edwin's life in exile is unknown, and there is no historical basis for placing him in Gwynedd.

== See also ==
- Family tree of Welsh monarchs

== Sources ==
- Davies, John (1990), A History of Wales (First ed.), London: Penguin Group (published 1993), ISBN 0-7139-9098-8
- Lloyd, John Edward (1911), A History of Wales from the Earliest Times to the Edwardian Conquest, vol. I (2nd ed.), London: Longmans, Green and Co. (published 1912)
- Phillimore, Egerton (1887), "Pedigrees from Jesus College MS. 20", in Phillimore, Egerton (ed.), Y Cymmrodor, vol. VIII, Honourable Society of Cymmrodorion, pp. 77–92
- Phillimore, Egerton (1888), "The Annales Cambriae and Old Welsh Genealogies, from Harleian MS. 3859", in Phillimore, Egerton (ed.), Y Cymmrodor, vol. IX, Honourable Society of Cymmrodorion, pp. 141–183
- Rhys, John (1904), Celtic Britain (3rd ed.), London: Society for Promoting Christian Knowledge
- Stephens, Thomas (8 August 1851), "The Poems of Taliesin, No. III", Archaeologia Cambrensis, New Series, No. VIII, vol. II, London: The Cambrian Archaeological Society (published October 1851), pp. 261–274
- Williams, P. B. (1828), "Historical Account of the Monasteries and Abbeys in Wales", in Rees, William Jenkins (ed.), Transactions of the Cymmrodorion, vol. II, London: Honourable Society of Cymmrodorion, pp. 203–262, Part 4

Regnal titles
Preceded by Beli ap Rhun	King of Gwynedd c. 599 – c. 616	Succeeded by Cadfan ap Iago
