= Battle of Maserfield =

Anglo-Saxon battle (c. 642 CE)

Coordinates: 52.860°N 3.054°W

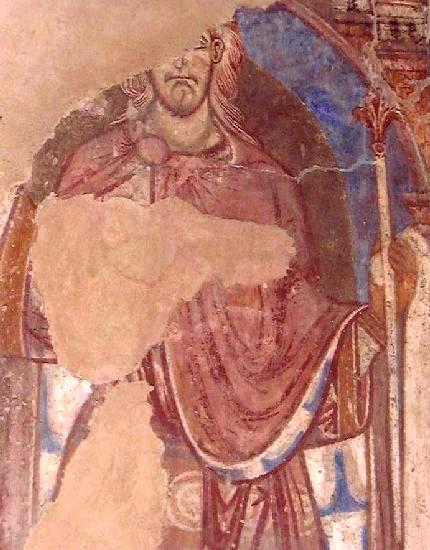
- A twelfth-century painting of St Oswald, killed at Maserfield, in Durham Cathedral
Date	5 August 641 or 642
Location	Oswestry, Shropshire
Result	Mercian-Brittonic victory

Belligerents
Kingdom of Mercia; Kingdom of Gwynedd; Kingdom of Powys	Kingdom of Northumbria

Commanders and leaders
King Penda; King Eowa †; Prince Cynddylan	King Oswald †

Strength
2,000 Mercian forces 1,200 Powysian forces	1,000

Casualties and losses
100 Mercians killed 600 Powysian fighters killed	Heavy, 800 killed

The Battle of Maserfield, (Welsh: Cad Maes Cogwy) was fought on 5 August 641 or 642 (642 according to Ward) between the Anglo-Saxon kings Oswald of Northumbria and Penda of Mercia allied with Welsh Kingdom of Gwynedd, ending in Oswald's defeat, death, and dismemberment.

The location was also known as Cogwy in Welsh, with Welshmen from Pengwern participating in the battle (according to the probably ninth-century Canu Heledd), probably as allies of the Mercians. Bede reports the commonly accepted date given above; the Welsh Annales Cambriae is generally considered incorrect in giving the year of the battle as 644. The site of the battle is traditionally identified with Oswestry.

== Background ==
"Since the death of Oswald's uncle Edwin of Northumbria at Hatfield Chase in 633, the Mercians under Penda had presented an obstacle to the power of Northumbria over the lands of Britain south of the Humber. Oswald had defeated Cadwallon ap Cadfan of Gwynedd, King of the Britons (Penda's ally at Hatfield) at Heavenfield in 634, and subsequently re-established Northumbrian hegemony across much of Britain; although it is thought that Penda recognized Oswald's authority in some form after Heavenfield, he may nevertheless have been hostile to Northumbrian power or at least perceived by Oswald as a threat."

== Location and place-names ==
The Battle of Maserfield was assumed for much of the twentieth century to have taken place at what is now Oswestry in Shropshire. The etymology of this name is "Oswald's Tree", while the traditional Welsh name for the same place is Croesoswald ("Oswald's Cross"); although an association with King Oswald of Northumbria is not certain, the name is popularly assumed to refer to him. In the mid-seventh century, Oswestry is thought to have probably still been in the territory of Powys. If this location is correct, it would mean Oswald was in the territory of his enemies, which would suggest he was on the offensive.

However, neither the Welsh nor English names for the battle site have been securely identified with modern reflexes or localised, and site of the battle is still debated among scholars; in 2020, Andrew Breeze suggested Forden in Powys, particularly on the basis of place-names that seem to be associated with the battle in the Welsh Canu Heledd.

The site of the battle is named Maserfelth (with the variant spelling Maserfeld) in the principal source for the battle, Bede's Historia ecclesiastica gentis Anglorum. The second element of this name is the Old English word that became field in present-day English. The first element is debated: it has been taken as a possibly unique Old English attestation of the word mazer; a word having something to do with Welsh maes ('field'); or to be the Welsh female name Meiser (an argument supported by the place-name Dyffryn Meiser in Canu Heledd).

The Annales Cambriae record a battle for 644 at a site which they call by the Old Welsh name Cocboy; the same name is found in a later form as Cogwy in Canu Heledd; and the battle described in these Welsh texts is agreed to be identical with the Battle of Maserfield known from Bede (albeit that Canu Heledd's account may owe little to historical reality). Andrew Breeze has etymologised this name as a compound of the Brittonic word *kok- ('rock') and a personal name *Boia, thus meaning 'hill of Boia'.

== Outbreak of war ==
The cause of the war that led to Maserfield is unknown. The historian Bede, writing in the next century, portrayed Oswald as a saintly figure in his Historia ecclesiastica gentis Anglorum; his desire to portray Oswald in a positive light may have led him to omit mention of Oswald's aggressive warfare. He says only that Oswald died fighting for his country at Maserfield, giving the impression that the battle was part of a "just war".

Penda's Welsh allies may have included Cynddylan ap Cyndrwyn of Powys: the awdl-poem Marwnad Cynddylan, thought to have been composed shortly after his death, says of him that "when the son of Pyd requested, how ready he was". This may be a reference to Penda, the son of Pybba, meaning that Cynddylan was eager to fight in battle alongside him.

== Battle ==
The outcome of the battle was defeat for the Northumbrians. Bede mentions the story that Oswald prayed for the souls of his soldiers when he saw that he was about to die. Oswald's body was cut into pieces, and his head and arms mounted on poles; the parts were retrieved in the next year by his brother and successor Oswiu. Since Penda was a pagan and Oswald was Christian, the latter was subsequently venerated as a martyr and saint. Bede reports a number of miracles attributed to Oswald's bones and to the spot where he died. (In the 12th century, Henry of Huntingdon wrote of the battle: "It is said the plain of Maserfeld was white with the bones of the Saints".) The Historia Brittonum accredits Penda's victory to "diabolical agency", but the characterization of the battle as a clash between Christians and pagans may be oversimplified if there were Welsh, who were Christian, fighting on Penda's side. The 20th-century historian, D. P. Kirby, wrote that the battle left Penda as "without question the most powerful Mercian ruler so far to have emerged in the midlands".

According to the Historia Brittonum and the Annales Cambriae, Penda's brother Eowa, also said to have been a king of the Mercians, was killed in the battle along with Oswald. The possibility exists that he was subject to Oswald and fighting in the battle as his ally. It has been suggested that Eowa was the dominant king among the Mercians for a period prior to the battle, and it has also been suggested that he had ruled the northern Mercians while Penda ruled the southern Mercians. Since the Historia Brittonum says Penda ruled for only ten years (Bede says 22 years: 633–655), this may mean that it was dating Penda's reign from the time of his victory at Maserfield; this would make sense if Eowa's death removed an important rival to Penda, enabling him to claim or consolidate authority over all the Mercians.

== Aftermath ==
Following the battle, Deira, in the southern part of Northumbria, chose a king of its own, Oswine, while Bernicia in the north (which had been dominant, with Oswald, a member of the Bernician royal line, ruling both Bernicia and Deira prior to Maserfield) was ruled by Oswald's brother Oswiu. Thus the battle led to the internal weakening and fracturing of the Northumbrian kingdom, a situation which lasted until after the Battle of the Winwaed, despite Oswine's murder on the orders of Oswiu in 651.

According to Frank Stenton, Maserfield left Penda as "the most formidable king in England". He maintained this position until his death in battle against the Bernicians at the Battle of Winwaed in 655; at times in the years between the two battles, his power was sufficient that he could mount destructive raids into Bernicia itself, at one point besieging Bamburgh, prior to his final, doomed campaign.
