= Battle of Chester =

Early 7th-century battle in England

Coordinates: 53°10′3″N 2°53′8″W

Date	c. 615/616
Location	Chester
Result	Northumbrian victory

Belligerents
Northumbria	Powys; Rhôs (Gwynedd cantref); Pengwern; Mercia?

Commanders and leaders
Æthelfrith of Northumbria	Selyf ap Cynan †; Iago ap Beli (possibly KIA); Cearl of Mercia (possibly KIA)

The Battle of Chester (Old Welsh: Guaith Caer Legion; Welsh: Brwydr Caer) was a major victory for the Anglo-Saxons over the native Britons near the city of Chester, England in the early 7th century. Æthelfrith of Northumbria annihilated a combined force from the Welsh kingdoms of Powys and Rhôs (a cantref of the Kingdom of Gwynedd), and possibly from Mercia as well. It resulted in the deaths of Welsh leaders Selyf Sarffgadau of Powys, Cadwal Crysban of Rhôs, and numerous other high-ranking warriors such as Gwion ap Cyndrwyn of Pengwern. Circumstantial evidence suggests that King Iago of Gwynedd may have also been killed. Other sources state the battle may have been in 613 or even as early as 607 or 605 AD.

According to Bede, a large number of monks from the monastery at Bangor on Dee who had come to witness the fight were killed on the orders of Æthelfrith before the battle. He told his warriors to massacre the clerics because although they bore no arms, they were praying for a Northumbria defeat.

The strategic significance of the battle remains unclear as Æthelfrith died in battle soon after the victory. However other historical accounts hold that Æthelfrith died in 616 AD by Rædwald of East Anglia, at the Battle of the River Idle.

It has been suggested that Cearl, the Anglo-Saxon king of Mercia, may have also been involved and shared in the Britons' defeat because his overkingship of eastern Wales and Mercia effectively ended until the rise of his successor, Penda by 633.

== Historical sources ==
=== Battle ===
Historian Charles Plummer, best known as an editor of Bede, believed that the battle occurred around 615 or 616, but near contemporary annals give a variety of dates. The Anglo-Saxon Chronicle says, for year 605 in one version and year 606 in another version:

And her Æðelfrið lædde his færde to Legercyestre, ⁊ ðar ofsloh unrim Walena. ⁊ swa wearþ gefyld Augustinus witegunge. þe he cwæþ. Gif Wealas nellað sibbe wið us. hi sculan æt Seaxana handa farwurþan. Þar man sloh eac .cc. preosta ða comon ðyder þæt hi scoldon gebiddan for Walena here. Scrocmail was gehaten heora ealdormann. se atbærst ðanon fiftiga sum.

And here Æðelfrið led his army to Chester, and there slew countless Welsh. And came about Augustinus's prophecy, that he said "If they do not have peace with us, they will die at the hands of the Saxons." There also were slain 200 priests who came there to pray for the Welsh army. Scrocmail was called their leader, and he escaped as one of fifty."

In the Brut y Brenhinedd (English: Chronicle of the Kings), which is a collection of variant Middle Welsh versions of Geoffrey of Monmouth's Latin chronicle Historia Regum Britanniae (History of the Kings of Britain), the battle is called Perllan Fangor (English: Bangor Orchard). Brut proved especially influential in medieval Wales, where it was largely regarded as an accurate account of the early history of the Britons. It therefore suggests the battle may have taken place nearer to Bangor-on-Dee rather than Chester.

=== Massacre ===
Bede mentions the killings of British monks by the Anglo-Saxons. He wrote that the monks:

resorted...to pray at the...battle...King Æthelfrith being informed [of this]...said, "If then they cry to their God against us, in truth, though they do not bear arms, yet they fight against us, because they oppose us by their prayers." He, therefore, commanded them to be attacked first ... About twelve hundred of those that came to pray are said to have been killed.

This episode was also noted in the Annals of Ulster s.a. 612 (recte 613):

Bellum Caire Legion ubi sancti occisi sunt (The battle of Caer Legion, in which holy men were slain)

Bede thought this was divine retribution for the Welsh bishops refusing to join Augustine of Canterbury in proselytizing the Saxons. During the English Reformation scholars such as Matthew Parker frequently argued that Augustine himself had been complicit in the battle and the massacre, but this contention swiftly degenerated into a sectarian dispute. The argument relies on the 604 date for the battle found in the Anglo-Saxon Chronicle as well as the suggestion that a passage in Bede that specifically exculpates Augustine, which appears in the Latin but not in the early English translation of the text, was a later addition aimed at distancing the churchman from the violence he predicted. The usually accepted dates 615/16 for the battle mitigate this argument, as Augustine is believed to have died in 604. The charge against Augustine was challenged or rejected by scholars of the 18th and 19th century such as Elizabeth Elstob, Henry Spelman, Henry Wharton, and Jeremy Collier. That Æthelfrith and his army were pagan is a further difficulty with the theory, which has no support from modern historians.

== Archaeology ==
Archaeological excavations at Heronbridge, just south of Chester, in 2004 uncovered post-Roman graves buried beneath a defensive earthwork over an old Roman settlement. There is evidence that they contain the bodies of casualties from the Battle of Chester.

== Significance ==
The precise reasons for the battle are unknown but Geoffrey of Monmouth states that King Æthelfrith's political rival, Edwin of Deira, was living in exile in Gwynedd. Although Geoffrey of Monmouth is often regarded as an unreliable source, there are some supporting references to Edwin in the writings of Reginald of Durham and the Welsh Triads. However, there is no evidence that Æthelfrith was in pursuit of Edwin.

The battle's outcome was once believed to have led to the severing of the land connection between Wales and the Old North - the old northern Brythonic kingdoms of Rheged and Kingdom of Strathclyde. However this view is now "generally understood" to be outdated as there is "almost no archaeological evidence for Anglo-Saxon settlement within the pagan period in Cheshire or Lancashire". In any case, the sea would have been the primary means of travel and trade in this period.

It also seems unlikely that Æthelfrith was protecting Anglian settlers in the area. Instead Æthelfrith may have been planning to attack Powys. The fact that he attacked the monks first, and only secondly the defending army, may perhaps be explained as a ruse to throw the defence into disarray.

== See also ==
- History of Cheshire
