= Battle of Hatfield Chase =

Battle between the kingdoms of Northumbria, Gwynedd and Mercia (633 AD)

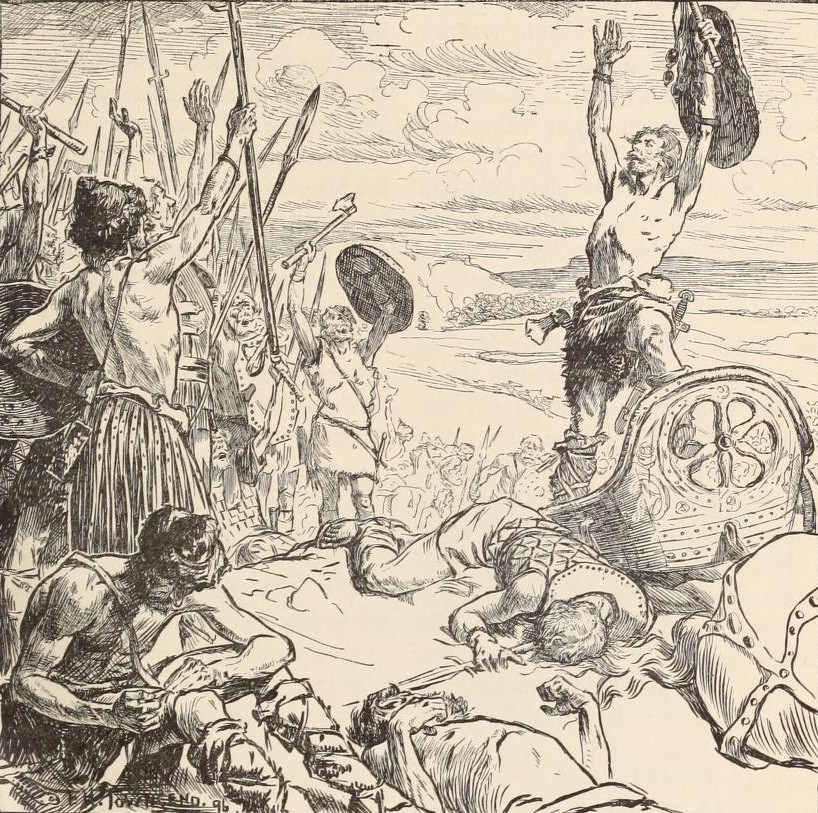
- Death of Edwin at Hatfield (illustration by F. H. Townsend, c. 1898)
Date	12 October 633 AD
Location	Disputed. Possibly Hatfield Chase, Yorkshire or Cuckney, Nottinghamshire.
Result	Gwynedd-Mercian victory

Belligerents
Kingdom of Gwynedd; Kingdom of Mercia; Kingdom of Elmet	Kingdom of Northumbria; Kingdom of Bernicia; Kingdom of Deira

Commanders and leaders
Cadwallon ap Cadfan; Penda; Eowa ?	Edwin †; Osfrith †; Eadfrith (POW)

Strength
1,800	3,000

Casualties and losses
700 killed or wounded	2,000 killed

The Battle of Hatfield Chase (Old English: Hæðfeld; Old Welsh: Meigen) was fought on 12 October 633 It pitted the Northumbrians against an alliance of Gwynedd and Mercia. The Northumbrians were led by Edwin and the Gwynedd-Mercian alliance was led by Cadwallon ap Cadfan and Penda. The site of the battle was a marshy area about 8 miles (13 km) northeast of Doncaster on the south bank of the River Don, though this location has been disputed. It was a decisive victory for Gwynedd and the Mercians: Edwin was killed and his army defeated, leading to the temporary collapse of Northumbria.

== Background ==
Edwin, the most powerful ruler in Britain at the time, had seemingly defeated Cadwallon a few years before the battle. Bede refers to Edwin establishing his rule over what he called the Mevanian islands, one of which was Anglesey, and another source refers to Cadwallon being besieged on the island of Priestholm (AC: Glannauc), which is off the coast of Anglesey. Later, Cadwallon defeated and drove the Northumbrians from his territories and then allied with Penda (Cadwallon being the stronger member of the alliance). Penda's status in Mercia at this time is uncertain—Bede suggests he was not yet king, but became king soon after Hatfield; the Anglo-Saxon Chronicle, however, says that he became king in 626.

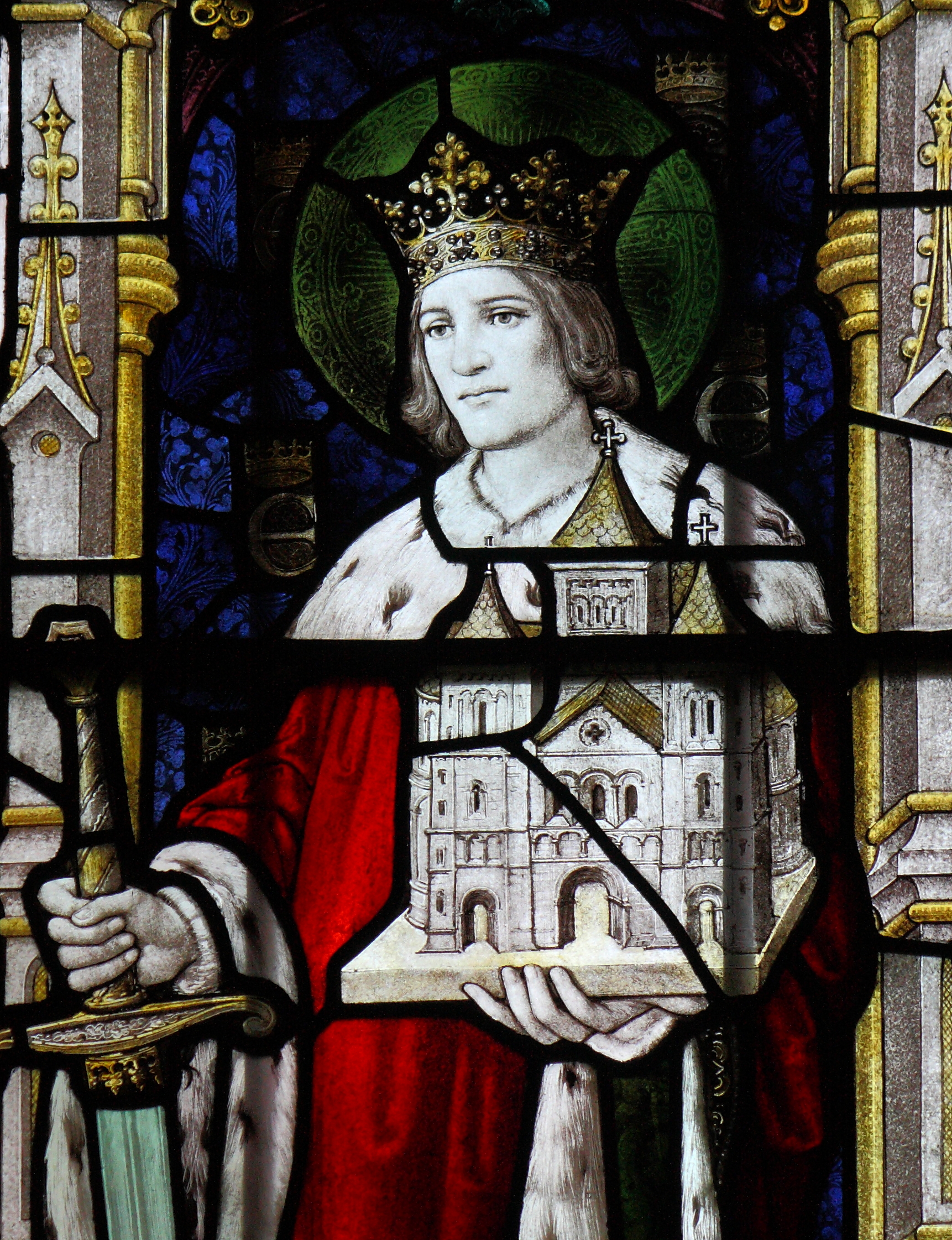
Depiction of Edwin at St Mary, Sledmere, Yorkshire.

== Results of the battle ==
The battle was a disaster for Northumbria. With both Edwin and his son Osfrith killed, and his other son Eadfrith captured by Penda (and later killed), the kingdom was divided between its constituent kingdoms of Bernicia and Deira. Eanfrith, a son of the former king Æthelfrith, returned from exile to take power in Bernicia, while Edwin's cousin Osric took over Deira. Cadwallon continued to wage a war against the Northumbrians, and was not stopped until he was defeated by Oswald at the Battle of Heavenfield (also known as Deniseburna, AC : Cantscaul) a year after Hatfield.

The historian D. P. Kirby suggested that the defeat of Edwin was the outcome of a wide-ranging alliance of interests opposed to him, including the deposed Bernician line of Æthelfrith; but considering the subsequent hostility between Cadwallon and Æthelfrith's sons, such an alliance must not have survived the battle for long.

== Challenged location ==
An investigation group has challenged the alleged site of the battle, mooted as being near Doncaster, South Yorkshire, suggesting an alternative location of nearby Cuckney, Nottinghamshire, at a place called locally High Hatfield, with an ancient name of 'Cukeney upon Hattfeild'.

During the 1950s workmen undertaking underpinning work at St Mary's Church (responding to subsidence due to local coal mining) uncovered a mass grave, which was thought to predate the 1100s church.

The group, known as the Battle of Hatfield Investigation Society (BOHIS), received grants from Heritage Lottery Fund of £15,600 in 2016, enabling ground penetrating radar surveys to take place identifying places where further mass burials could be located. The Diocese of Southwell refused permission for excavations on the locations identified in November 2017.

In April 2018 the group was awarded a further £58,000 from lottery funding and a private donation, to cover costs of LIDAR scanning and opening archaeological trenches in fields surrounding church land.

== In fiction ==
The Battle of Hatfield Chase is featured in Menewood by Nicola Griffith, a historical fiction novel about Saint Hilda of Whitby, who was a relative of Edwin of Northumbria.
