= Ealdwulf of East Anglia =

King of East Anglia

Ealdwulf

King of the East Angles
- Reign: c. 664 – 713
- Predecessor: Æthelwold
- Successor: Ælfwald
- Born: c. Mid 620s - c. 640
- Died: 713 (age c. 73 - c. 90
- Issue: Ælfwald; Ecgburga
- Dynasty: Wuffingas
- Father: Æthilric
- Mother: Hereswith
- Religion: Christian

Ealdwulf (Old English: Aldwulf), also known as Aldulf or Adulf, was king of East Anglia from c. 664 to 713. He was the son of Hereswitha, a Northumbrian princess, and of Æthilric (d. before c. 664), whose brothers all ruled East Anglia during the seventh century. Ealdwulf recalled that when he was very young, he saw the Christian/pagan temple belonging to his ancestor Rædwald.

Few details are known of Ealdwulf's long reign of 49 years; its length reflects the success of alliances formed in the decades before his ascension. During his period as king, East Anglia experienced stability and growth, not least in its commercial centre at Gipeswic (now modern Ipswich), and an East Anglian coinage appeared for the first time. Within his kingdom, the diocese of the East Angles was divided, with a new seat at Helham (probably at North Elmham in Norfolk).

He and his otherwise unknown queen produced at least two children. He was succeeded in 713 by their son Ælfwald, the last of the Wuffingas to rule the East Angles.

== Origins and childhood ==
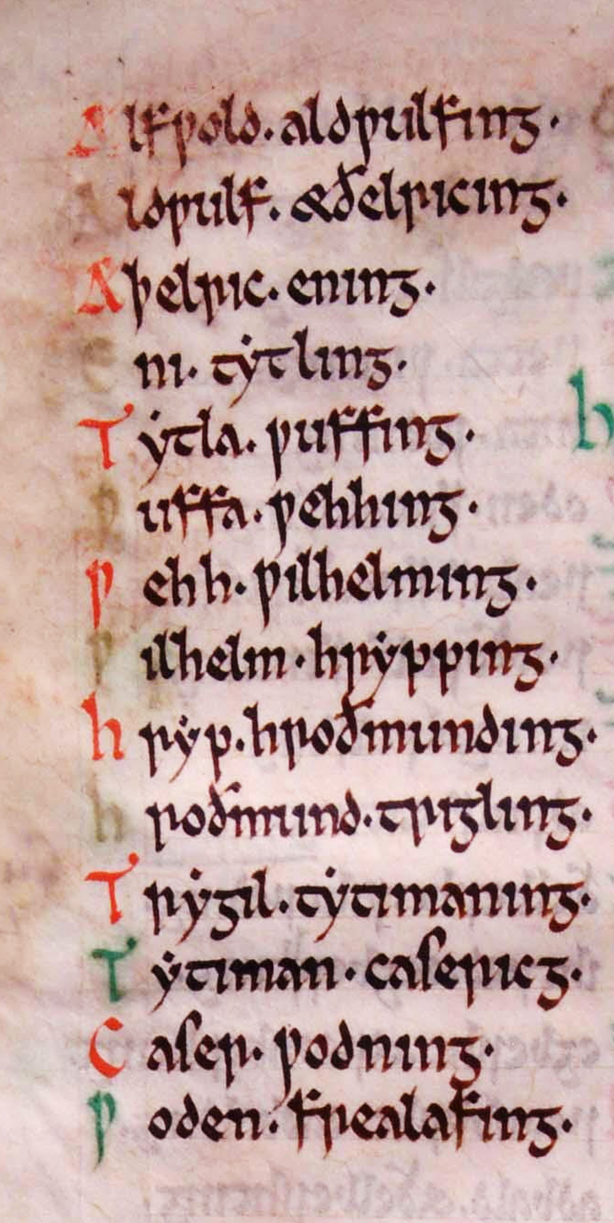
The East Anglian tally from the Textus Roffensis, with Ealdwulf's name listed near the top

Until 749, the long-lived independent kingdom of East Anglia (Old English: Ēast Engla Rīce) was ruled by the Wuffingas, named after Wuffa, the grandfather of Raedwald. The dynasty's genealogy is included in the Anglian collection, a compilation of Anglo-Saxon royal genealogies and regnal lists, and Ealdwulf's name is included near the top of the list for East Anglia.

The Northumbrian monk Bede named Hereswitha as Ealdwulf's mother. Nothing is known of her before she was married into the East Anglian royal family, other than that she was the daughter of a nephew of Edwin of Northumbria named Hereric and his wife, Breguswith. Ealdwulf's father Æthilric was unknown to Bede. Æthilric's three brothers all succeeded in turn as kings of East Anglia and his father was Eni, a brother of Raedwald. Æthilric may have been the same person as Egric of East Anglia, who was killed in battle c. 636.

According to Bede, Ealdwulf recalled that as a boy he saw the temple containing both Christian and pagan altars maintained by Rædwald. Rædwald died in c. 624 so it is likely this temple was upheld for some time after his death. Unless Ealdwulf was born earlier than believed. The temple is the only recorded example of a building connected with the Wuffingas royal family. The Ecclesiastical History of the English People describes how Rædwald was converted to Christianity at the court of his overlord, Æthelberht of Kent. Persuaded by his pagan wife to apostasize, he compromised by building an altar inside his wife's temple.

Ealdwulf's father died before around 647, after which his mother Hereswitha travelled to Gaul to lead a religious life at the Frankish royal oratory at Chelles, a move which suggests that no religious houses for women existed in East Anglia at that time.

== Reign ==
Ealdwulf succeeded his uncle Æthelwold of East Anglia as king in c. 664; genealogical records do not show that Æthelwold had sons to succeed him. He was the last ruler of East Anglia known to Bede, who mentions him in his Ecclesiastical History of the English People as being in the 17th year of his reign at the time of the Council of Hatfield in 680. Little is known about his rule, other than he was king for 49 years. He died in 713; his age at death is uncertain, but estimates suggest he would have been unusually old for the period.

The Anglo-Saxon dioceses before 925

A plague swept across the Anglo-Saxon kingdoms during the 660s, leaving at one point Boniface (originally called Brigilsus or Berhtgisl) of the East Anglian diocese of Dommoc the only English bishop left whose consecration was derived from Canterbury.

Bisi, bishop of the East Angles, in declining health and no longer able to exercise his authority, was unable to prevent the archbishop of Canterbury, Theodore of Tarsus from dividing his diocese, creating a second East Anglian seat at Helmham (taken to be North Elmham or South Elmham). Two new bishops were appointed, Æcci to Dommoc and Baduwine to Elmham.

According to the author Steven Plunkett it has been suggested by historians that the revenue of the East Anglian royal estates centred upon Rendlesham (the 'Five-and-a-half Hundreds', or Wicklaw) were bestowed of Ealdwulf upon Ely at its foundation, since they formed the largest share of Bishop Æthelwold of Winchester's re-endowment of Ely in around 970. The Papal Privileges may have been obtained at Rome by Wilfrid in around 680 for Ely and Peterborough. If true, they show a policy of reinforcing dynastic authority through ecclesiastical structures.

=== Coinage and commerce ===
The first coins produced in East Anglia were minted during the reign of Ealdwulf. The issue and use of English coins during his reign followed its development in Kent, gold shillings or thrymsas produced during the 660–670s, and thereafter, by a debasement linked to the diminishing gold quality of Frankish coin, with silver sceattas or pennies of various types. The distribution of findspots reveals foci of their use and possibly their issue at East Anglian centres of importance, especially in the north-west around Hunstanton, Bawsey in the Thetford area, the edge of the Fens around Isleworth and Exning, in the east around Burgh Castle, and in the area around Rendlesham, Ipswich and in the River Gipping valley.

A map of the Anglo-Saxon kingdoms

The status of coinage was not yet as a true currency, nor overtly regnal. The pieces attributed to East Anglian production are found alongside others mainly of Kentish, East Saxon, and Frisian or Netherlandish types, reflecting external communications with those centres. Gipeswic witnessed the full development of its first major expansion from the quayside north to the Cattlemarket area, with the established production of Frisian-inspired Ipswich Ware pottery to the north-east of this area. The settlement's continental trade partners may have been Domburg in Walcheren, and Dorestad, the large emporium on the Rhine south of Utrecht. This route gained importance as the Christian mission to Frisia developed from the 680s.

=== Relations with Kent and Mercia ===
Ealdwulf, along with Æthelred of Mercia and Aldfrith of Northumbria, were addressed by Pope Sergius in a letter of 693, urging their acceptance of Berhtwald of Reculver as the successor to Theodore at Canterbury.

The closing years of Ealdwulf's reign were coloured by the unsatisfactory rule of Ceolred of Mercia, who was castigated by Boniface for what the historian Barbara Yorke describes as "personal immorality and violation of church priviledges". At this time the Mercian royal hermit Guthlac was living on the fenland island of Crowland. His secluded retreat became a place of refuge for the Mercian royal counter-claimant, Æthelbald, who appears to have received encouragement and protection there from the East Anglian nobility.

== Marriage and family ==
The identity of Ealdwulf's queen is unknown. There were at least two children, his heir Ælfwald, and Ecgburga, who became an abbess. It can be assumed that the king and his family were Christians throughout their lives.

According to annals written in Francia, Ealdwulf died in 713. Ælfwald succeeded him as king, ruling until 749, after which the succession passed to kings of unknown lineage; historians do not understand the political situation that caused this to happen .

== Sources ==
- Bruce-Mitford, Rupert (1974). Aspects of Anglo-Saxon Archaeology: Sutton Hoo and Other Discoveries. London: Victor Gollancz Limited. ISBN 0-575-01704-X.
- Bede (1910). The ecclesiastical history of the English nation. Translated by Stevens, John. London: J.M. Dent. OCLC 1042965355.
- Dunbar, Agnes Baillie Cunninghame (1904). A Dictionary of Saintly Women. Vol. 1. London: G,. Bell. OCLC 1157191940.
- Fryde, E.B.; Greenway, D.E.; Porter, S.; Roy, I., eds. (1986). Handbook of British chronology (3rd ed.). London: Royal Historical Society. ISBN 978-0-86193-106-4.
- Haddan, Arthur West; Stubbs, William, eds. (1869). Councils and ecclesiastical documents relating to Great Britain and Ireland. Vol. 3. Oxford: Clarenden Press. OCLC 1317490.
- Hoggett, Richard (2010). The Archaeology of the East Anglian Conversion. Woodbridge, UK: The Boydell Press. ISBN 978-1-84383-595-0.
- Keynes, Simon (2013). "Appendix II: Archbishops and Bishops, 597-1066". In Lapidge, Michael; Blair, John; Scragg, Donald (eds.). The Wiley Blackwell Encyclopedia of Anglo-Saxon England. Chichester: John Wiley & Sons Ltd. pp. 539–566. doi:10.1002/9781118316061.app2. OCLC 1166860385.
- Kirby, D.P. (2000). The Earliest English Kings. London and New York: Routledge. ISBN 978-0-415-24211-0.
- Lapidge, Michael; Gneuss, Helmut, eds. (1985). Learning and Literature in Anglo-Saxon England. Cambridge: Cambridge University Press. ISBN 978-0-521-12871-1.
- Pestell, Tim (2004). Landscapes of Monastic Foundation: The Establishment of Religious Houses in East Anglia, c. 650–1200. Woodbridge, UK: Boydell Press. ISBN 978-1-84383-062-7.
- Plunkett, Steven (2005). Suffolk in Anglo-Saxon Times. Stroud, UK: Tempus. ISBN 978-0-7524-3139-0.
- Warner, Peter (1996). The Origins of Suffolk. Manchester and New York: Manchester University Press. ISBN 978-0-7190-3817-4.
- Whitelock, Dorothy (1972). "The pre-Viking age church in East Anglia". Anglo-Saxon England. 1. Cambridge University Press: 1–22. doi:10.1017/S0263675100000053. JSTOR 44510584. S2CID 161209303.
- Yorke, Barbara (2002). Kings and Kingdoms of Early Anglo-Saxon England. London and New York: Routledge. doi:10.4324/9780203447307. ISBN 978-0-415-16639-3. S2CID 160791603.

English royalty
Preceded by Æthelwold	King of East Anglia c. 664 – 713	Succeeded by Ælfwald
