= Dommoc =

Uncertain location in Suffolk, England, UK

The Anglo-Saxon dioceses before 925

Dommoc (or Domnoc), a place not certainly identified but probably within the modern county of Suffolk, was the original seat of the Anglo-Saxon bishops of the Kingdom of East Anglia. It was established by Sigeberht of East Anglia for Saint Felix in c. 629–631. It remained the bishopric of all East Anglia until c. 673, when Theodore of Tarsus, Archbishop of Canterbury, divided the see and created a second bishopric, the See of Elmham associated with both North Elmham, Norfolk and South Elmham, Suffolk. The see of Dommoc continued to exist until the time of the Viking Wars of the 860s, after which it lapsed.

== Foundation ==
The primary authority for the foundation of the see of Dommoc is Bede's Historia ecclesiastica which stipulates Felix's mission in relation to Sigeberht's rule. (Note: The date is calculated as described in § Early chronology.) Following the assassination of Eorpwald of East Anglia by Ricberht in c. 627 the kingdom fell back into "error" for three years, before Sigeberht, brother or half-brother of Eorpwald, took possession of the kingdom. Sigeberht had lived in exile in Gaul during his brother's lifetime, where he had been initiated in the sacraments of the Christian faith, becoming a very Christian man of learning. On his accession he resolved to ensure that the whole kingdom shared his Christian faith and he was very ably supported by Saint Felix. Felix had been born and consecrated in Burgundy. He came to Archbishop Honorius of Canterbury (Saint Honorius) and expressed his desire to preach the Gospel of Life. Honorius sent him to the East Angles, where he found a fruitful multitude of believers and brought that whole province to the faith and works of righteousness. He accepted the episcopal seat in the city ('civitas') of Dommoc, and when he had governed it for seventeen years he died there in peace. An alternative account surviving in the much later work of William of Malmesbury relates that Sigeberht and Felix came to the kingdom together from Gaul.

== Early chronology ==
The date of the foundation of Dommoc is estimated from the foregoing events and from the duration of tenure of the first three bishops. Edwin of Northumbria was baptised by Paulinus of York at Easter 626 and they then undertook the conversion of the Kingdom of Lindsey and of Eorpwald and his kingdom. Eorpwald was slain soon after his baptism, after which there was a reversal of faith for three years. Felix was bishop for seventeen years, his successor Thomas for five, and his successor Berhtgisl Boniface for a further seventeen (a total of 39 episcopal years). Both Thomas and Berhtgisl were consecrated by Archbishop Honorius, who died in 653. After Berhtgisl's death Archbishop Theodore, who reached Canterbury in 668–689, appointed Bisi to Dommoc, and Bisi attended the Council of Hertford in 673. By then Bisi's health was declining so that he was unable to administer the diocese and soon afterwards Theodore divided the see. Since Berhtgisl cannot have died later than 670, the foundation of Dommoc should date to c. 630–631 and the assassination of Eorpwald to c. 627. This would place the death of Felix at c. 647 and of Thomas c. 652. That would accord with the Liber Eliensis tradition that Felix baptised Saint Æthelthryth (Etheldreda) in or soon after 631 at Exning and with William of Malmesbury's statement that he baptised Cenwalh of Wessex in East Anglia before that king was restored to Wessex by King Anna in c. 647.

== Location ==
Despite its former importance, the original location of Dommoc has been lost for many centuries and forms the subject of scholarly debate. This reflects rival claims staked during the 13th century by the monks of Eye, Suffolk (for Dunwich, Suffolk), and of Rochester in Kent (for Walton, Suffolk). The uncertainty therefore arose between the tenth and twelfth centuries. William Camden, in his Britannia, promoted general acceptance of the identification with Dunwich, formerly a splendid city on the Suffolk coast between Aldeburgh and Southwold, all but a tiny part of which has now been lost to coastal erosion. The Rochester claim for Walton refers to the place near or in Felixstowe, Suffolk, at the tip of the Colneis Hundred peninsula between the River Deben and the River Orwell. This Walton is not to be confused with Walton-on-the-Naze, Essex, which stands on the south side of the Orwell and Stour estuary mouth, and which has never been seriously considered as a candidate for Dommoc. The scholarly revival of the claim for Walton as Dommoc was the work of Stuart Rigold.

Bede records that Sigeberht ruled East Anglia together with Ecgric, his relative or cognatus, who until Sigeberht's abdication had ruled over part of the kingdom, and afterwards succeeded to the rule of all of it. The meaning of the arrangement is not clear, but there is no difficulty in accepting that during his own reign Sigeberht had the power to grant a coastal site to Felix either at Dunwich or Felixstowe, since it was he who granted the land, possibly an old shore fort, at Cnobheresburg to Saint Fursey.

Bede's use of the term civitas for Dommoc, (Note: Dommoc is also occasionally called Domnoc or Dommoc-ceastre) suggests that the site had once been a Roman settlement, possibly fortified. The re-use of Roman forts or fortified enclosures for early Anglo-Saxon ecclesiastical and monastic purposes is well-attested, for instance at Othona (Bradwell-on-Sea, Essex), Rochester and Reculver (Kent), Durobrivae (Castor, Cambridgeshire), and in East Anglia at Fursey's monastery (probably Burgh Castle, or Gariannonum). It is certain that there was a stone fort at Walton (Walton Castle), like other shore-forts of about 6 acres (2.4 ha) enclosure, and that it was adjacent to a large Roman settlement, most of which (including the fort) is now lost into the sea. The nature of Roman Dunwich is less well understood, for although some important Roman roads lead towards it, the site was lost to the sea too early for archaeological records. However it formerly had an important harbour which might have been protected by a fort. (Note: Similarly, Aldeburgh—which means 'old burgh' (a burgh is 'a fortified place') in Old English—may also have possessed a fort defending the Alde estuary.) The placename evidence is also indecisive.

G.E. Fox and C.E. Stevens suggested that the fort at Walton might be the Portus Adurni of the Notitia Dignitatum, usually identified as Portchester. Be that as it may, the existence of additional forts not mentioned in the Notitia presents no difficulty since that is not a list of all fortresses, but of military units and their stations under the command of the Count of the Saxon Shore.

== Dunwich ==
The similarity of sound between Dommoc and Dunwich may be misleading. Dommoc is a difficult name to construe, but could derive from the Latin: dominicum, a church, possibly in an Irish-assimilated form domnach, as Fletcher notes. The name Dunwich (Note: In c. 1200 Donewic or Donewiz) should mean the wic 'market', possibly from vicus (often riverine or estuarine), 'at the hill'. The wic names for places of importance like Ipswich and Norwich are comparable. If the name Dommoc became Dunwich, its original meaning was lost in the shift and a different etymological structure was adopted to explain and replace it, between the tenth and twelfth centuries.

There was no known church dedicated to Saint Felix at Dunwich, but that is no objection since the founder could not have commemorated himself and would likely have made an apostolic dedication. Dunwich was thriving at Domesday, but following sea encroachments many of its ecclesiastical possessions were granted to the rising Priory of Eye in north Suffolk. The seal-matrix of the last-known bishop of Dommoc, Ethilwald, was discovered about two hundred years ago at Eye. Eye also possessed in post-mediaeval times a book now lost, known as the Red Book of Eye, written in Lombardic majuscule and presumably with purple-stained pages, reputed to have belonged to Saint Felix. These may have reached Eye from Dunwich, but they might also have been taken to Hoxne, close to Eye, during the tenth or eleventh centuries from any centre in East Anglia, when Hoxne was temporarily the episcopal seat.

During the fifteenth century, when the Dunwich identification had taken hold, a series of glass windows depicting Saint Fursey, Saint Felix, Saint Etheldreda, and other Anglo-Saxon subjects existed at Blythburgh church, not far from Dunwich. However, that site had its own independent Wuffing tradition connected with the grave of King Anna of East Anglia (died 653); conversely, its position at the fordable headwaters of the Blyth estuary, controlling the Blyth and its watershed hinterland suggests the likely existence of a royal dwelling in that neighbourhood in the time of Anna himself, and of Saint Felix. If so, the siting of an episcopal seat at Dunwich would be readily explicable.

== Felixstowe ==
The apparent connection between Felixstowe and the name of Felix is suggestive, but the placename Felixstowe is not recorded before the thirteenth century and its origin is disputed. A stow may be a holy site, but the Domesday name for the Walton fort is burh, a form of the word burgh. A priory dedicated to St Felix was founded within the fort at Walton around the end of the eleventh century by Roger Bigod, 1st Earl of Norfolk, who invited monks from Rochester to establish themselves there. During the twelfth century the powerful Bigod family also had a castle at Walton and a separate large residence there (the Manor, or Old Hall), at which King John issued the Ipswich Town Charter in 1200.

The church site at nearby Falkenham (overlooking the river Deben between Hemley and Felixstowe Ferry) may have early Wuffing associations, for it is dedicated to the royal martyr Saint Æthelberht (died 794). Falkenham was at Domesday a sub-manor or berewick of Walton, and in the time of Archbishop Lanfranc it was claimed by Rochester as one of a group of possessions which had been taken from it into royal keeping during the Viking Wars.

The situation of Walton fort, overlooking the seaward reaches of the Deben estuary towards the former island of Bawdsey on the north bank, was of prime importance to the control of that river and lay directly within the sphere of Rendlesham, the Wuffinga royal dwelling known to have existed a little above the fordable headwaters of the Deben estuary in c. 660. The Sutton Hoo cemetery demonstrates the outstanding importance of this river as a seat of regnal power shortly before Sigeberht's time, during the period of Rædwald's reign, and as the centre of a regio or province spreading from the Orwell to beyond the River Alde and across the tributary hinterlands of the Alde and Deben rivers.

It is strongly implied that St Paulinus, from the Canterbury mission, was present in East Anglia at Rædwald's court in around 616, and it seems likely that the dedication of Rendlesham church to Saint Gregory the Great belongs to the early phases of that mission into East Anglia. After his escape from York in 632–633, Paulinus became Bishop of Rochester until his death c. 644, during the first decade of Felix's episcopacy of Dommoc. Bede records that Felix obtained teachers from Kent to supply the school founded in East Anglia by Sigeberht. Rochester was then the closest bishopric to East Anglia by the sea-route to Kent from the Deben. It is therefore possible that when Roger Bigod founded a priory at Walton fort, he was consciously renewing a connection between Rochester and Walton which had been developed in the time of Felix and Paulinus.

Rochester's claim is expressed thus: "b. Felix fundavit eccl'iam q'e m'o Felixstowe uocatur et in ea sedit xvji annis" ['The blessed Felix founded the church which is now called Felixstowe and sate in that (place) 17 years']. It appears in the monastic register compiled before 1251 (Harleian MS 261), under the annal for 633. The 16th-century antiquary, John Leland noted sources supporting both the claims of Eye for Dunwich and of Rochester for Walton. There are, however, several East Anglian sites associated with the work of Saint Felix. Although one of these two seems more likely, there is no certainty that it was either.

== Notes ==
=== Sources ===
- Bede (1969). Colgrave, Bertram; Mynors, R. A. B. (eds.). Historia gentis Anglorum ecclesiastica [Bede's ecclesiastical history of the English people]. Translated by Bertram Colgrave; R. A. B. Mynors. Oxford: Clarendon Press. ISBN 0-19-822202-5.
- Fairclough, John; Plunkett, S. J. (2000). "Drawings of Walton Castle and other monuments in Walton and Felixstowe". Proceedings of the Suffolk Institute of Archaeology and History. 39 (4): 419–459.
- Field, John (1980). Place-names of Great Britain and Ireland. Newton Abbot, Devon, UK: David & Charles. ISBN 0389201545. OCLC 6964610.
- Fletcher, Richard A. (1998). The conversion of Europe: From Paganism to Christianity 371–1386 AD. London: Fontana. ISBN 978-0-00-686302-1.
- Fox, George E. (1907). "Romano-British Suffolk". In William Page (ed.). A History of Suffolk. The Victoria History of the Counties of England. Vol. I. Folkestone, Kent, UK: Victoria County House. pp. 279–323. ISBN 978-0-7129-0647-0 – via University of London, Institute of Historical Research.
- Haslam, Jeremy (1992). "Dommoc and Dunwich: A reappraisal" (PDF). Anglo-Saxon Studies in Archaeology and History. 1992 (5): 41–46.
- Pestell, Tim (2004). Landscapes of monastic foundation: The establishment of religious houses in East Anglia c. 650-1200. Woodbridge, Suffolk, UK: Boydell Press. ISBN 9781846152368.
- Plunkett, Steven J. (2005). Suffolk in Anglo-Saxon times. Stroud, Gloucestershire, UK: Tempus. ISBN 978-0752431390.
- Rigold, S. E. (June 1961). "The Supposed See of Dunwich". Journal of the British Archaeological Association. 24 (1): 55–59. doi:10.1080/00681288.1961.11894745.
- Rigold, S. E. (June 1974). "Further Evidence About the Site of Dommoc". Journal of the British Archaeological Association. 37 (1): 97–102. doi:10.1080/00681288.1974.11894960.
- Scarfe, Norman (2004) [1984]. Suffolk in the Middle Ages: Studies in places and place-names, the Sutton Hoo ship-burial, saints, mummies and crosses, Domesday Book, and chronicles of Bury Abbey. Woodbridge, UK: Boydell. ISBN 9781843830689.
- Stevens, C. E. (January 1940). "The British Sections of the Notitia Dignitatum". Archaeological Journal. 97 (1): 125–154. doi:10.1080/00665983.1940.10853729.
- West, Stanley E. (1998). "A corpus of Anglo-Saxon material from Suffolk". East Anglian Archaeology. 84.
- Whitelock, Dorothy (January 1972). "The pre-Viking age church in East Anglia". Anglo-Saxon England. 1: 1–22. doi:10.1017/S0263675100000053.
