= Christianisation of East Anglia =

Conversion of the Kingdom of East Anglia to Christianity

- Part of the Christianisation of Anglo-Saxon England
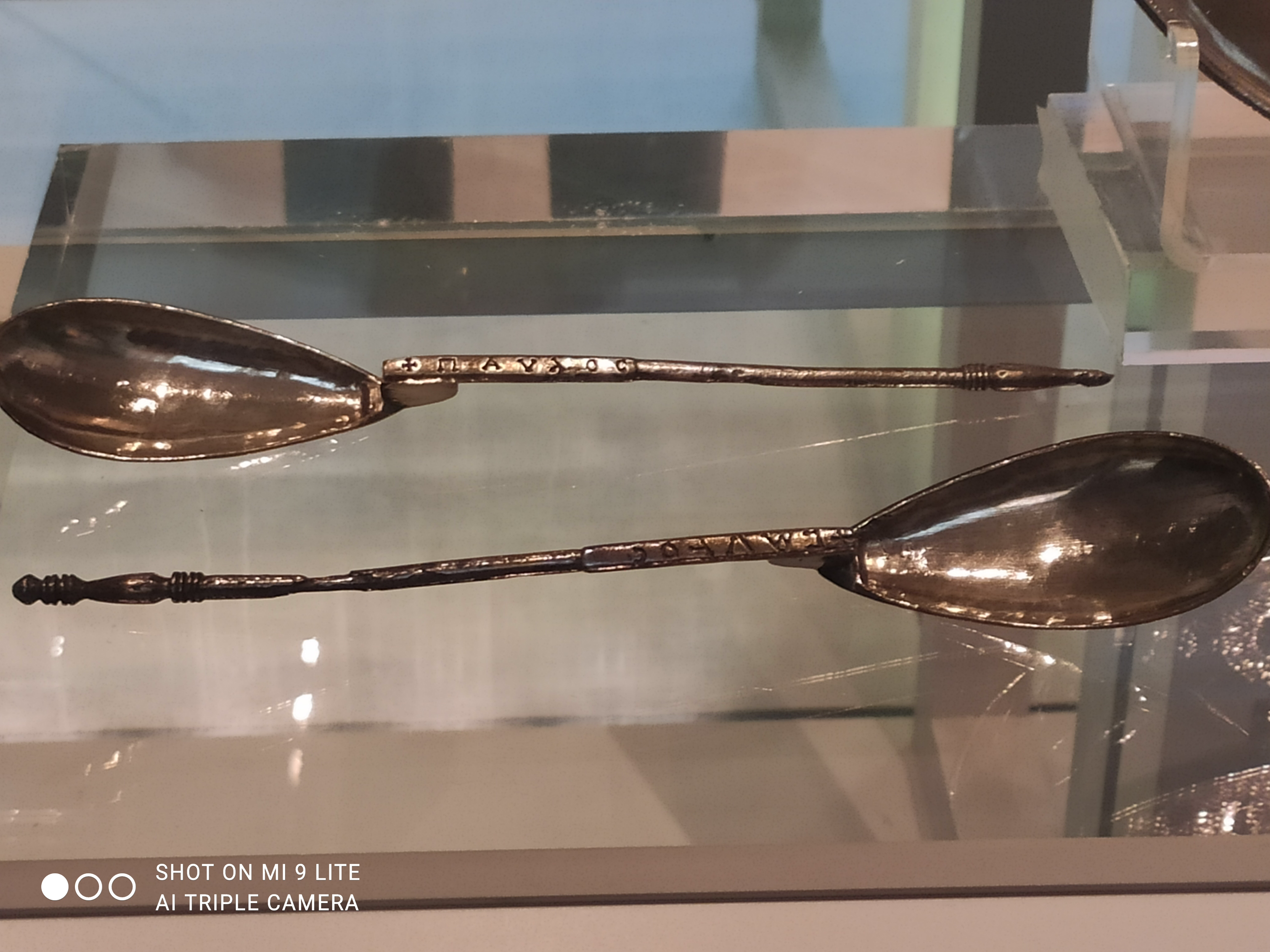
- Byzantine Christening Spoons Found in Sutton Hoo
- Date: c. 604 – 640
- Location: Kingdom of East Anglia
- Cause: Influence of Æthelberht of Kent and the Gregorian mission
- Outcome: Establishment of Christianity in East Anglia

The Christianisation of East Anglia was a gradual process through which the Kingdom of East Anglia converted from Anglo-Saxon paganism to Christianity during the early 7th century. The process began under the influence of external powers such as Kent and Northumbria, and was closely tied to the wider Christianisation of Anglo-Saxon England. Although the earliest royal conversion, Rædwald's, was politically motivated and marked by religious syncretism, the faith became more firmly established under later Wuffinga rulers such as Sigeberht and Anna. Along with the gradual disappearance of pagan rulers by the mid-7th century, continental missionaries, particularly Felix of Burgundy, played a central role in consolidating Christianity within the kingdom leading to a general Christianisation of the population.

== Background ==
The political landscape of England around 600 AD was shaped by a network of rival Anglo-Saxon kingdoms known collectively as the Heptarchy. Æthelberht of Kent had emerged as the Bretwalda, the most powerful ruler, in southern England, exercising a partial overlordship over neighbouring kingdoms including King Rædwald's East Anglia. Æthelberht’s marriage to the Frankish princess Bertha, a Christian, had brought him into contact with the Frankish Church and paved the way for the arrival of the Gregorian mission led by Augustine of Canterbury in 597 leading to Æthelberht’s baptism. The mission’s initial successes in Kent established Christianity as a religion associated with royal power and continental alliances, encouraging Æthelberht to promote the faith among his dependent rulers.

== c. 604–624: Rædwald's baptism and religious syncretism ==
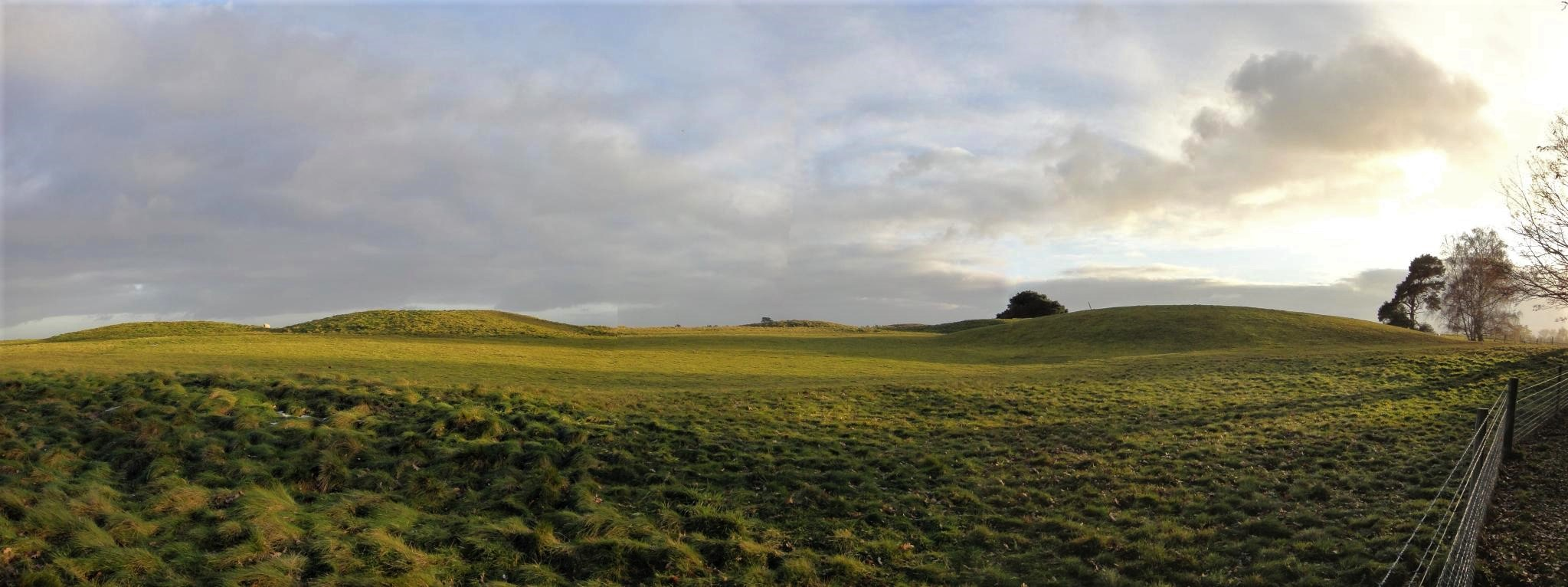
Burial site at Sutton Hoo

As a client king, Rædwald was likely forced to convert, with his baptism taking place in Kent, possibly with Æthelberht as a sponsor and godfather. This act was likely a means to reinforce Æthelberht's authority over Rædwald, being motivated more by the king's political agenda than Augustine of Canterbury's religious one. The date of the baptism is not recorded by Bede, however it has been proposed to have taken place within the first 5 years of the Gregorian mission, but not before 601.

Rædwald's nominal conversion did not seem to have resulted in a significant alteration of his worldview, with there being little evidence for his adoption of Christianity. Furthermore, Bede records that he returned to paganism on his journey home under the influence of his heathen wife and is later described as practising syncretism between the two religions, having both an altar to Christ and to heathen gods. The king's limited adoption of Christianity is further attested in that both his sons, Eorpwald and Sigeberht, were heathen when he died. Furthermore, King Ealdwulf of East Anglia is recorded to have remembered Rædwald's temple still standing when he was a boy, suggesting the building was still substantial in the 630s and 640s. The king continuing to practise the traditional religion, in contrast to Sæberht who remained Christian until his death, has been suggested to mean that Æthelberht's influence over the East Angles was weaker than that over the East Saxons.

Upon the death of Æthelberht in 616, Rædwald rose to the position of overking in southern England. It has been proposed that just as the Kentish king used his power and authority to enforce baptism of the East Anglian and East Saxon kings, so too did Rædwald encourage the return to traditional religion in Kent and Essex.

The date of Rædwald's death is not clear, with it likely taking place towards the end of the range 616–627. (Note: This range is bounded by Rædwald's involvement in the Battle of the River Idle in 616 and the first dated recording of his successor Eorpwald ruling in East Anglia in 627.) Whilst it is given as 624 by the 13th-century chroniclers Roger of Wendover and Matthew Paris, their sources are unknown. The ship burial in mound 1 at Sutton Hoo is probably the grave of Rædwald. Other elite burials there include mound 17, in which a young nobleman was buried with a horse, and mound 2 which was also a ship burial. These burials occurred in a wider context of smaller burials centred around a prehistoric howe. While the elite burials begin in the early 6th century, the richest ones occur at a time that Christianity was being established in England, leading to the suggestion that graves like mound 1 were a protest against the incoming religion, demonstrating heathen identity in contrast, or defiance, with Christianity.

== c. 624–628: Eorpwald's baptism and later death in a heathen backlash ==
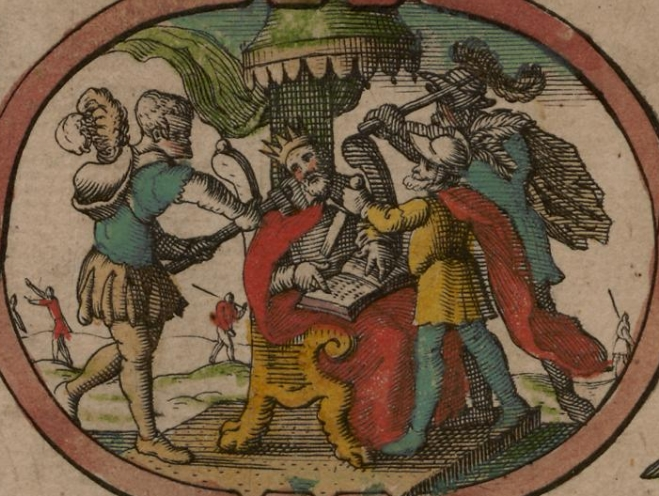
An imaginary depiction of Eorpwald's murder from John Speed's 1611 Saxon Heptarchy.

After the death of Rædwald around 624, he was succeeded by one of his sons, Eorpwald. The first dated record of Eorpwald ruling is 627 and it was likely around this time that Edwin of Northumbria either forced or persuaded him to adopt Christianity. The East Anglian king was likely baptised in a church in territory controlled by Eadwine and by Northumbrian bishops as there were not such facilities present in East Anglia at that time. This has been proposed to have taken place in 627, with the short time after the death of Rædwald suggesting the high priority of this to Eadwine and Paulinus of York.

It is possible that after the baptism, Eorpwald was forced to accept a Deiran priest into his court, however Bede does not record this taking place, nor of any churches being built in East Anglia at this time. Bede does however describe the conversion of the entire kingdom, which may imply that Eadwine and Paulinus travelled there to oversee an event such as a mass baptism. Similar to when Æthelberht of Kent imposed Christianity on Rædwald, Eorpwald's baptism because of Eadwine has been proposed to have had a colonial dimension. By this idea, the conversion was a means of making Eorpwald accept a foreign cult and an authority whose seat was outside his own kingdom.

In 627 or 628, Eorpwald was killed in a heathen reaction, with Bede identifying the killer as Ricberht who then likely succeeded him as king of the East Angles.

== c. 627–640: Overthrow of Ricberht by Sigeberht and solidification of Christianity ==
After the killing of Eorpwald, Ricberht is described by Bede as being king for 3 years, despite the power held by Eadwine at that time. It has been argued that the length of his reign attests to the support for Ricberht's overthrowing of Eorpwald; there was likely a strong East Anglian dislike of Eadwine's overlordship over the kingdom and of Eorpwald's compliance with the domination. It has been further suggested that Ricberht's name implies that he was a member of the East Anglian elite and possibly from the royal family itself. (Note: The proposition that the name "Ricberht" suggests membership of the elite is that the component "-berht" is likely of Kentish or Frankish origin.)

In 630 or 631, Eorpwald's brother Sigeberht succeeded to the throne after having been exiled during his brother's reign to Gaul, where he had adopted Christianity and after this point no heathen kings of the East Angles are recorded. He is described as ruling one part of the kingdom of East Anglia, while his kinsman Ecgric, who was possibly heathen and remained so, ruled the other. (Note: Kirby proposes Ecgric's likely religion given that Bede talks extensively about Sigeberht's Christian patronage yet mentions nothing about Ecgric's religion.) Sigeberht's exile attests to the ties between the East Anglian and Merovingian royal families during the 7th century. Similarly, continental elites, as opposed to Eadwine of Deira, are most likely responsible for supporting his takeover in East Anglia.

== Embedding Christianity ==
Continental missionaries were key in the conversion of East Anglia in the 630s, with Felix of Burgundy being appointed as bishop to spread Christianity around the kingdom. Honorius, the Archbishop of Canterbury, sent Felix, a subject of the Frankish King, to Dunwich after Felix came to the archbishop and made known his desire to go to East Anglia as a missionary. It's unclear whether Honorius consecrated Felix in England as the first bishop of East Anglia or if Felix had already been consecrated on the continent. The dating of this episode is unclear, but it is probably close to 631. It is possible that King Sigeberht of East Anglia, who converted to Christianity while he was in exile on the continent, had already met Felix and was behind Felix's journey to Honorius.

There is no record of strong organised opposition to Felix, which has been interpreted as suggesting that it was Deiran domination that the elites strongly rejected, as opposed to Christianity itself. Sigeberht eventually retired his kingship, and passed on the role wholly to Ecgric who had been ruling the kingdom at the same time as him. Sigeberht and Ecgric were killed in battle, possibly in the early 640s, both, whereupon Anna became king, who Bede praised for his piety.

Anna was killed around 653 in battle with Penda in a series of conflicts that likely centred on control of the lands of the Middle Angles. Though the Mercians were heathen at this time, a bishop was provided for the Middle Angles when they established control over the region. This suggests the inhabitants of the region had adopted Christianity by this point under influence from East Anglia. The East Anglian kings also were important in the adoption of Christianity in the Kingdom of Essex, with Swithhelm being baptised in East Anglia during the reign of Æthelwald.

== Christianity under Viking rule ==
In 869 the Viking Great Heathen Army conquered East Anglia and the killed the king Edmund the Martyr. Although the Viking Guthrum ruled as a Christian, monasteries such as Beodricesworth were destroyed or abandoned, and the native episcopal structure collapsed as the Danes established the Danelaw. Despite this, Christian practice persisted among the local population, and the cult of Edmund quickly developed into a major focus of regional identity and resistance, first at the now unknown Haegelisdun and then under royal sponsorship to Beodricesworth monastery (which would later become Bury St Edmunds Abbey. By the early 10th century, with the reconquest of East Anglia by Edward the Elder and the restoration of English royal control, the Church was re-established, and new monastic foundations arose around Edmund’s shrine, marking a revival of Christian life in the region.

== Bibliography ==
- Blair, John (2005). The Church in Anglo-Saxon Society. Oxford: Oxford University Press. ISBN 978-0-19-921117-3.
- Campbell, James; John, Eric; Wormald, Patrick (1991). The Anglo-Saxons. London, England; New York, N.Y., USA: Penguin Books. ISBN 978-0-14-014395-9.
- Higham, Nicholas John (1997). The Convert Kings: Power and Religious Affiliation in Early Anglo-Saxon England. Manchester, UK: Manchester University Press. ISBN 978-0-7190-4827-2.
- Higham, Nicholas John; Ryan, Martin J. (2013). The Anglo-Saxon world. New Haven: Yale University Press. ISBN 9780300125344.
- Hindley, Geoffrey (2006). A Brief History of the Anglo-Saxons: The Beginnings of the English Nation. New York: Carroll & Graf Publishers. ISBN 978-0-7867-1738-5.
- Kirby, David Peter (2000). The earliest English kings (Rev. ed.). London; New York: Routledge. ISBN 9780415242110.
- Pryce, Huw (2009). "Conversions to Christianity". In Stafford, Pauline (ed.). A companion to the early Middle Ages. Blackwell Publishing Ltd. pp. 143–159. ISBN 978-1-4051-0628-3.
- Sellar (1907). Bede's Ecclesiastical History of England - Christian Classics Ethereal Library. London: George Bell and Sons.
- Speed, John (1988). The Counties of Britain: a Tudor Atlas. London: Pavilion Books. ISBN 1-85145-131-5.
- Tyler, Damian (April 2007). "Reluctant Kings and Christian Conversion in Seventh-Century England". History. 92 (306): 144–161. doi:10.1111/j.1468-229X.2007.00389.x. ISSN 0018-2648.
- Wood, Ian (January 1994). "The Mission of Augustine of Canterbury to the English". Speculum. 69 (1). The University of Chicago Press: 1–17. doi:10.2307/2864782. JSTOR 2864782. S2CID 161652367.
- Yorke, Barbara (1990). Kings and Kingdoms of Early Anglo-Saxon England. London: Seaby. doi:10.4324/9780203447307. ISBN 978-1-85264-027-9.
- Yorke, Barbara (2003). "The Adaptation of the Anglo-Saxon Royal Courts to Christianity". The cross goes north: processes of conversion in northern Europe, AD 300-1300. Woodbridge, Suffolk, UK : Rochester, NY: York Medieval Press; Boydell & Brewer. doi:10.2307/j.ctv136bvsn.19. ISBN 1903153115.
