= South Elmham =

South Elmham (also Southelmham) is a location in north Suffolk which was an ancient deanery dating back to the 7th century when it was given to the Bishop of East Anglia. South Elmham constituted a "ferthing", i.e a quarter of Wangford Hundred. This area included the parishes of Homersfield and Flixton.

== Nine parishes ==
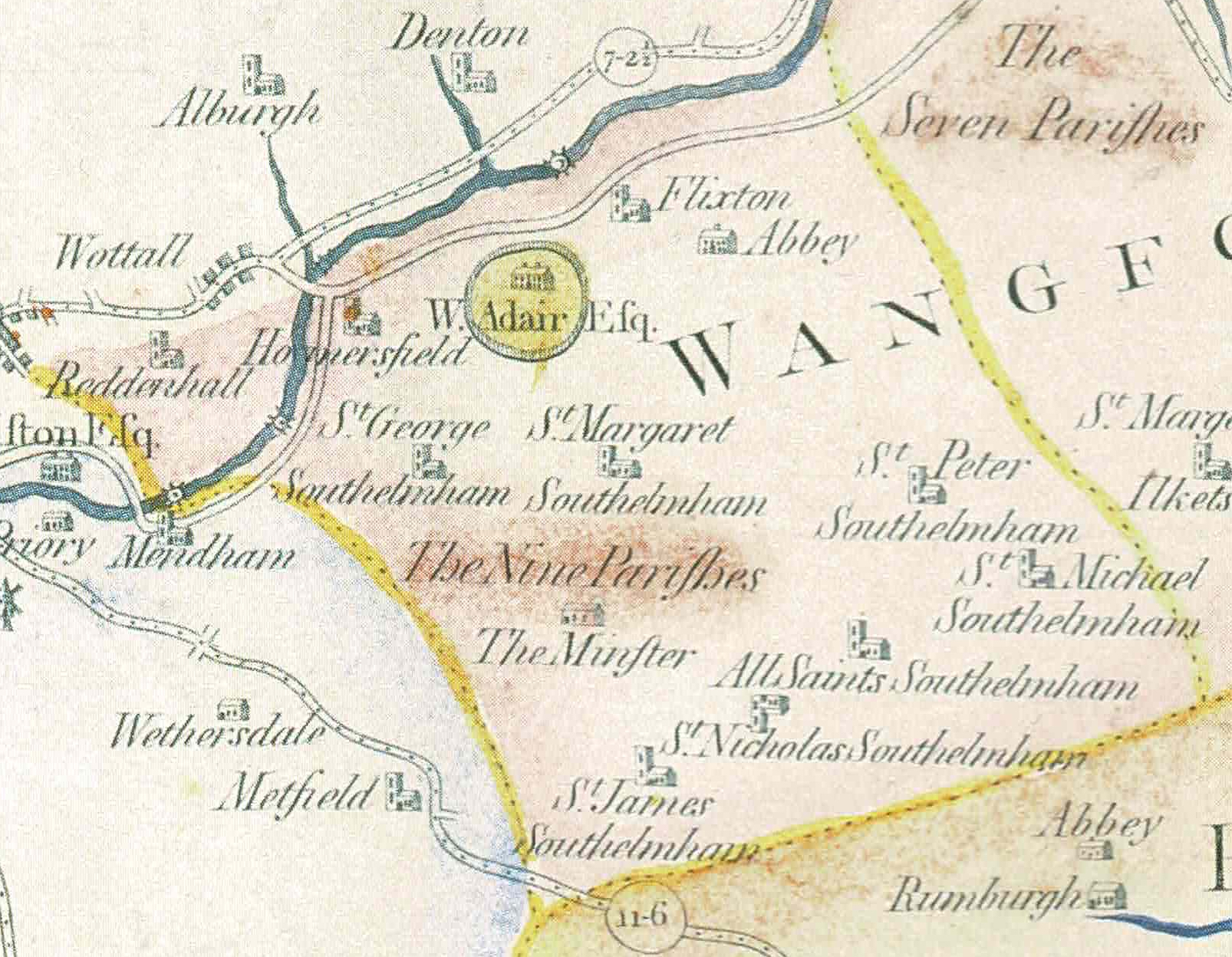
1825 edition of John Kirby's map as revised by his sons Joshua and William in 1766

In The Suffolk Traveller (1735) John Kirby describes how Wangford Hundred is divided into three parts: the nine parishes, the seven parishes and a remaining part around Beccles. The nine parishes are:

- St Mary Flixton
- St Mary Homersfield
- St George Southelmham
- St James Southelmham
- St Margaret Southelmham
- St Michael Southelmham
- St Nicholas Southelmham, "whose church is so entirely demolished, that hardly any rubbish of it is to be found".
- St Peter Southelmham
- All Saints Southelmham

When John's sons, Joshua and William produced a second edition in 1764 they added the comment:

"These nine Parishies which are called the Deanery of Southelmham, are represented in old Wills as one Township; and as such they have an Estate in Aldborough and Wortwell in Norfolk, common to them all. For we frequently meet with Homersfield, in the Town of Southelmham; and St. James, in the Township of Southelmham; and the like."

== Etymology ==
Views on the etymology of the name – and indeed its significance for the Christianisation of the Anglo Saxon – differ. Keith Briggs and Kelly Kirkpatrick only mention a derivation from Old English based on Elm + Ham yielding "Elm Farmstead". However Mel Birch mentions this derivation, but then goes on to discuss Claude Morley's suggestion arising from area being called Almeham in the Doomsday Book. He rejected the derivation from Elm as inappropriate for an area 9,000 acres in size and with such a particular nature. Instead he offered a derivation from the saxon term ælmesse referring to "our alms" or "alms-giving" saying that this referred to an area of land given as alms by the recent christian convert, King Sigeberht of East Anglia to Felix of Burgundy, the first Bishop of the East Angles. The latter view supports the claims for South Elmham to be the seat (sede) of the See of Elmham in a long standing controversy in relation to rival claims by North Elmham, in Norfolk.
