= Sigeberht of East Anglia =

East Anglian king and saint

Sigeberht
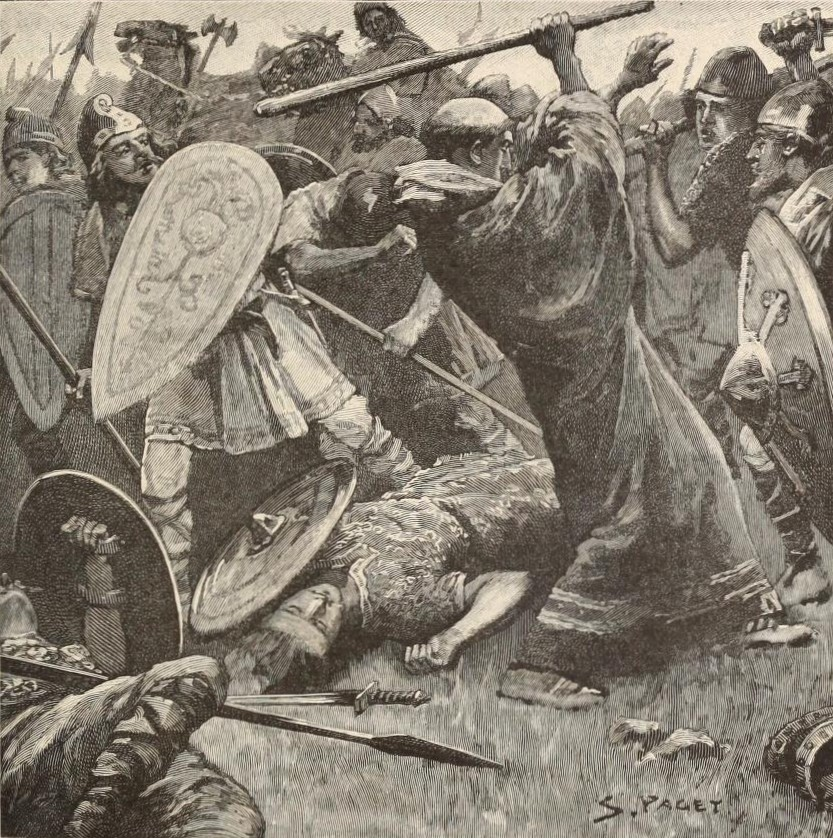
- Death of Sigeberht in the battle with the Mercians (illustration by Sidney Paget, c. 1898)

King of the East Angles
- Reign: c. 629 – c. 634 (abdicated after ruling jointly with Ecgric)
- Predecessor: Ricberht
- Successor: Ecgric (alone)
- House: Wuffingas
- Father: possibly Rædwald
- Religion: Christianity

Sigeberht of East Anglia
- Venerated in: Anglican Communion; Catholicism; Eastern Orthodoxy
- Canonized: Pre-congregation
- Feast: 16 January (in Catholic and Eastern Orthodox Churches); • Also variously commemorated: · 25 January (Eastern Orthodox Church); · 27 September (Catholic and Eastern Orthodox Churches); · 29 October (Catholic Church)

Sigeberht of East Anglia (also known as Saint Sigebert), (Old English: Sigebryht) was a saint and a king of East Anglia, the Anglo-Saxon kingdom which today includes the English counties of Norfolk and Suffolk. He was the first English king to receive a Christian baptism and education before his succession and the first to abdicate in order to enter the monastic life. The principal source for Sigeberht is Bede's Ecclesiastical History of the English People, which was completed in the 730s.

Sigeberht was probably either a younger son of Rædwald of East Anglia, or his step-son from Rædwald's marriage to a pagan princess from the kingdom of Essex. Nothing is known of his life before he was exiled to Gaul, which was possibly done in order to ensure that Rædwald's own descendants ruled the kingdom. After his step-brother Eorpwald's assassination in about 627, Sigeberht returned to East Anglia and (perhaps in the aftermath of a military campaign) became king, ruling jointly with Ecgric, who may have been either a son of Rædwald's, or his nephew.

During Sigeberht's reign the Christianisation of East Anglia was advanced greatly, even though his co-ruler Ecgric probably remained a pagan. Alliances were strengthened between the Christian kingdoms of Kent, Northumbria and East Anglia, with Sigeberht playing an important part in the establishment of the Christian faith in his kingdom. Saint Felix arrived in East Anglia to assist him in establishing his episcopal see at Dommoc, starting a school for teaching Latin and granting the Irish monk Saint Fursey a monastery site at Cnobheresburg (possibly Burgh Castle). Sigeberht eventually abdicated his power to Ecgric and retired to his monastery at Beodricesworth. At an unknown date, East Anglia was attacked by a Mercian army led by its king, Penda. Ecgric and the East Anglians appealed to Sigeberht to lead them in battle, but he refused and had to be dragged from his monastery to the battlefield. He refused to bear arms during the battle, during which both East Anglian kings were slain and their army was destroyed.

== Family background, exile, conversion and education ==
Sigeberht ruled the kingdom of East Anglia (Old English: Ēast Engla Rīce), a small independent Anglo-Saxon kingdom that comprised what are now the English counties of Norfolk and Suffolk and perhaps the eastern part of the Fens in Cambridgeshire.

It is not known when Sigeberht was born and nothing is known of his life before he was exiled from East Anglia prior to becoming king, as few records have survived from this period of English history. The most reliable source for Sigeberht's background and career is Bede's Ecclesiastical History of the English People (produced in 731), in which Bede stated that Sigeberht was the brother of Eorpwald, (Note: Bede, ii, 15: 'His temporibus regno Orientalium Anglorum, post Erpualdum Redualdi successorem, Sigberct frater eius praefuit, homo bonus ac religiosus'.) and the son of Rædwald, who ruled the kingdom of East Anglia from about 599 to 624. The 12th-century English historian William of Malmesbury described him as Rædwald's stepson "by his mother's side". The stepson theory is strengthened by the fact that the name Sigeberht is without comparison in the East Anglian Wuffingas dynasty, but closely resembles the naming fashions of the East Saxon royal house. IIt has been tentatively suggested by the historian Steven Plunkett that if this identification is correct, Rædwald's wife had previously been married to an East Saxon prince or ruler. Rædwald's own principal heir was Rægenhere (a youth of warrior age in 616, when he was slain in battle) and his second heir was Eorpwald, slain by the heathen Ricberht in about 627.

Rædwald was baptised before 616 and a Christian altar existed in his temple, but his son Eorpwald was not himself a convert when he succeeded Rædwald in about 624. Since it is known that Rædwald's wife (who was Sigeberht's mother) did not become a Christian, Sigeberht must have received limited encouragement to convert to Christianity before being sent to Gaul and remaining there as an exile for many years during the lifetime of Eorpwald, "while fleeing from the enmity of Rædwald", as Bede reports. His exile supports the stepson theory, if Rædwald was protecting Eorpwald's succession against a possible claim by a son who was not of the Wuffingas line.

Whilst living in Gaul as an exile, Sigeberht was converted and baptized and became a devout Christian and a man of learning. He was strongly impressed by the religious institutions and schools for the study of reading and writing which he found during his long exile.

== King of the East Angles ==
=== Accession ===
A map showing the general locations of the Anglo-Saxon peoples around the year 600

After an interregnum prompted by Eorpwald's assassination, Sigeberht returned from Gaul to become ruler of the East Angles. It is likely that he gained the kingdom by military means, because his prowess as a commander was later remembered. During his reign, part of the kingdom was governed by Ecgric his 'kinsman', a relationship described by the Latin term cognatus. This may mean that Ecgric was a son of Rædwald. However, Plunkett is amongst those that consider Ecgric to be the same person as Æthelric, named in the East Anglian tally (in the Anglian collection) as a son of Eni, Rædwald's brother. Whoever the pagan Ecgric was, Sigeberht had equal or senior power while he ruled, because the influence of his religious patronage was felt throughout his kingdom.

Sigeberht's Christian conversion may have been a decisive factor in his achieving royal power, since at that time Edwin of Northumbria (616–632 or 633) was the senior English king and he and Eadbald, who ruled Kent, were Christian. Eadbald certainly had contacts with the Frankish rulers. After Dagobert succeeded Clothar II in Francia in 628, Sigeberht's emergence helped to strengthen the English conversion upon which Edwin's power rested. Sigeberht is likely to have encouraged the conversion of Ecgric, if he was not already Christian. Edwin's encouragement took shape in the marriage of his grand-niece Hereswitha, sister of Hilda of Whitby, to Æthelric, Rædwald's nephew. Hereswith and Hilda were under Edwin's protection and were baptised with him in 626.

=== Foundation of the East Anglian bishopric ===
The kingdom of East Anglia during the early Saxon period

Bede relates that the East Anglian apostle Felix of Burgundy came to England from Burgundy as a missionary bishop and was sent by Honorius, Archbishop of Canterbury, to assist in establishing Christianity in Sigeberht's kingdom. William of Malmesbury had the later story that Felix accompanied Sigeberht to East Anglia. In either case, this dates Sigeberht's accession to around 629–630, because Felix was bishop for seventeen years, his successor Thomas for five and Thomas' successor Berhtgisl Boniface for seventeen – and Berhtgisl died in around 669. Sigeberht established the bishop's seat of his kingdom for Felix at Dommoc, claimed variously for Dunwich or Walton, Felixstowe (both coastal sites in Suffolk). If the seat was at Walton (as Rochester claimed during the 13th century), the site of Dommoc may have been within the precinct of a Roman fort which formerly stood there.

=== Foundation of the East Anglian school ===
Sigeberht secured the future of the Church in East Anglia when he established a school in his kingdom so that boys could be taught reading and writing in Latin, on the model that he had witnessed in Gaul. Felix assisted him by obtaining teachers of the kind who taught in Kent. According to the Life of Gregory the Great, Paulinus of York, who from 633 to 644 was the Bishop of Rochester in northern Kent, had been connected with Rædwald's court during the exile of Edwin.

=== Foundation of Cnobheresburg ===
The allegiance of Felix to Canterbury determined the Roman basis of the East Anglian Church, influenced along continental lines, though Felix's training in Burgundy may have been coloured by the teaching of the Irish missionary Saint Columbanus in Luxeuil. In around 633, perhaps shortly before Saint Aidan was sent to Lindisfarne from Iona, the Irish royal hermit and missionary Saint Fursey came to East Anglia from the Athlone area, along with his priests and brethren. Sigeberht granted him a monastery site in an old Roman fort called Cnobheresburg, usually identified as Burgh Castle, near Great Yarmouth. Felix and Fursey both effected a large number of conversions and established many churches in Sigeberht's kingdom. Bede records that Archbishop Honorius and Bishop Felix much admired the work of Saint Aidan of Lindisfarne and it is therefore likely that they also appreciated the tasks accomplished by Saint Fursey, whose community also lived according to the ascetic principles of Irish Christianity.

== Abdication and martyrdom ==
At some point during his reign, Sigeberht abdicated his power to Ecgric and retired to lead a religious life within a monastery he had built for his own use. Bede does not name the location of Sigeberht's monastery, but later sources name it as Beodricesworth, afterwards called Bury St Edmunds. If that identification is accepted, the likely site was in the original precinct of the mediaeval abbey at Bury St Edmunds, probably the 'worth' or curtilage of Beodric after whom the place was originally named. The site occupied a strong position on the upper reaches of the Lark valley, which drains north-west into the Great Fen through important early settlements at Icklingham, Culford, West Stow and others. This was a line of access towards Ely, where a foundation of Saint Augustine may already have existed, and towards Soham, where Saint Felix is thought to have founded a monastery.

At an unknown date, which may have been in the early 640s, East Anglia was attacked by a Mercian army and Ecgric was obliged to defend it with a much smaller force, though one that was not negligible. The East Angles appealed to Sigeberht to leave his monastery and lead them in battle, hoping that his presence and the memory of his former military exploits would encourage the army and make them less likely to flee. Sigeberht refused, saying that he had renounced his worldly kingdom and now lived only for the heavenly kingdom. However, he was dragged from the monastery to the battlefield where, unwilling to bear arms, he went into battle carrying only a staff. The Mercians were victorious and Sigeberht, Ecgric and many of the East Angles were slain and their army was routed. In this way Sigeberht became a Christian martyr. He is among the names of the kings who according to an ancient saying, were avenged by the slaying of Penda in 654.

The Church that Sigeberht had done so much to establish in East Anglia survived for two centuries, enduring 'evil times' (such as the period when the kingdom was under attack by the armies of Penda of Mercia). It lasted continuously under a succession of bishops until the Danish Great Heathen Army invaded East Anglia in the 860s.

The feast day of Sigeberht is commemorated on various dates, even within the same religious tradition. For example, different Catholic calendars of saints designate 16 January 27 September, or 29 October, or note two dates as alternatives. The Lives of the Saints, written by the 19th century Anglican scholar Sabine Baring-Gould, is amongst the texts that gives Sigeberht's feast day as 29 October. Eastern Orthodox sources also give 16 January, but in addition list 25 January and 27 September as the relevant feast day.

== See also ==
- For more information on Ecgric's Wuffingas identity, see the family trees in Ecgric of East Anglia.

== Sources ==
- Baring-Gould, Sabine (1897). The Lives of the Saints. London: John C. Nimmo.
- Bede (1999). Ecclesiastical History of the English People. Oxford University Press. ISBN 978-0-19-283866-7. (available at Google Books)
- Giles, J.A. (1904). William of Malmesbury's Chronicle of the Kings of England: From the Earliest Period to the Reign of King Stephen. London: H.G. Bohn.
- Haslam, Jeremy (1992). "Dommoc and Dunwich: A Reappraisal" (PDF). Anglo-Saxon Studies in Archaeology and History. 5. Oxford: 41.
- Henry of Huntingdon (1996). Historia Anglorum: the history of the English people. Translated by Greenway, Diana E. Oxford University Press. ISBN 978-0-19-822224-8.
- Kirby, D.P. (2000). The Earliest English Kings. London and New York: Routledge. ISBN 978-0-415-24211-0.
- Plunkett, Steven (2005). Suffolk in Anglo-Saxon Times. Stroud: Tempus. ISBN 978-0-7524-3139-0.
- Stenton, Sir Frank (1988). Anglo-Saxon England. New York: Oxford University Press. ISBN 978-0-19-821716-9.
- Warner, Peter (1996). The origins of Suffolk. Manchester and New York: Manchester University Press. ISBN 978-0-7190-3817-4.
- Yorke, Barbara (2002). Kings and Kingdoms of Early Anglo-Saxon England. London and New York: Routledge. ISBN 978-0-415-16639-3.

=== Websites ===
- "Celtic and Old English Saints". Celtic Saints. 2021. "Saint Sigebert: Died 635; feast day 16 January, sometimes 27 September"
- Thua, Laban (8 May 2019). "Saint Sigeberht of East Anglia - Feast Day - January 16". Catholic Daily Readings.
- Young, Francis (29 October 2015). "St Sigebert: East Anglia's first martyr king". Dr Francis Young − publications.

English royalty
Preceded by Ricberht	King of East Anglia with Ecgric; 629–634	Succeeded by Ecgric (alone)
