= Felix of Burgundy =

7th-century Bishop of Dunwich and saint

Saint Felix
- Bishop of the East Angles
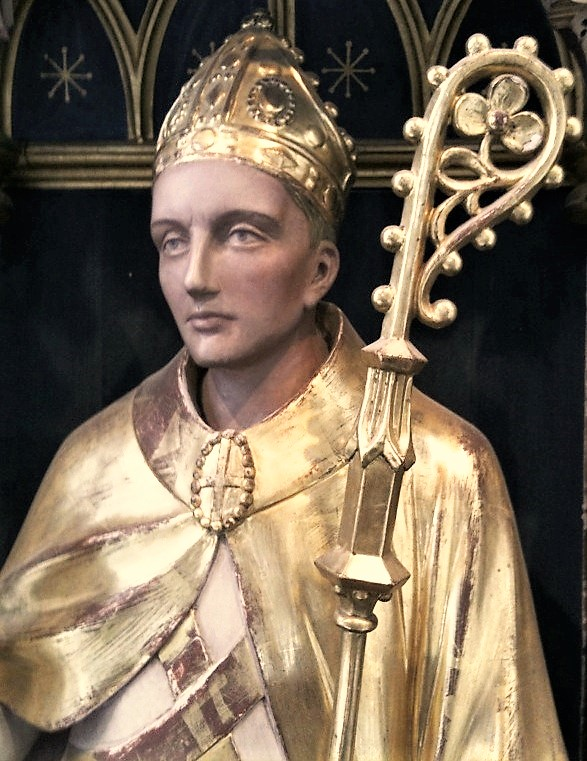
- A statue of Felix (1885) at St Peter Mancroft, Norwich
- See: Dommoc
- Appointed: c. 630
- Term ended: c. 648
- Successor: Thomas

Orders
- Consecration: by Honorius of Canterbury

Personal details
- Born: Burgundy
- Died: 8 March 647 or 648 Dunwich, East Anglia

Sainthood
- Feast day: 8 March
- Venerated in: Church of England; Eastern Orthodox Church; Catholic Church

Felix of Burgundy (died 8 March 647 or 648), also known as Felix of Dunwich, was the first bishop of the kingdom of the East Angles. He is widely credited as the man who introduced Christianity to the kingdom. Almost all that is known about him comes from the Ecclesiastical History of the English People, completed by the English historian Bede in about 731, and the Anglo-Saxon Chronicle. Bede wrote that Felix freed "the whole of this kingdom from long-standing evil and unhappiness".

Felix came from the Frankish kingdom of Burgundy, and may have been a priest at one of the monasteries in Francia founded by the Irish missionary Columbanus—he may have been Bishop of Châlons, before being forced to seek refuge elsewhere. Felix travelled from Burgundy to Canterbury, before being sent by Archbishop Honorius of Canterbury to Sigeberht of East Anglia's kingdom in about 630 (travelling by sea to Babingley in Norfolk, according to local legend). Upon his arrival in East Anglia, Sigeberht gave him a see at Dommoc, possibly at Walton, Suffolk near Felixstowe, or Dunwich in Suffolk. According to Bede, Felix helped Sigeberht to establish a school in his kingdom "where boys could be taught letters".

Felix died on 8 March 647 or 648, having been bishop for 17 years. His relics were translated from Dommoc to Soham Abbey and then to the abbey at Ramsey. After his death, he was venerated as a saint; several English churches are dedicated to him. Felix's feast date is 8 March.

== Background and early life ==
Felix was born in the Frankish kingdom of Burgundy, although his name prevents historians from conclusively identifying his nationality. According to the English historian Bede, he was ordained in Burgundy.

The historian Peter Hunter Blair suggested it is possible that Felix was associated with Irish missionary activity in Francia, which was centred in Burgundy and was particularly associated with the Irish missionary Columbanus and Luxeuil Abbey. Columbanus had arrived in Francia in about 590, after going into voluntary exile. A few years later he founded the monastery at Luxeuil.

The Frankish dominions c. 629, which included Felix's native land of Burgundy

At this time, associations existed between the kingdoms of Francia and East Anglia, a small independent Anglo-Saxon kingdom that mainly comprised what are now the English counties of Norfolk and Suffolk. The 7th-century jewelled grave goods found at Sutton Hoo display manufacturing technologies that are likely to be of Frankish origin, and materials that arrived in East Anglia via Francia. The connection between the East Anglian Wuffingas dynasty and the Frankish abbess Burgundofara at Faremoutiers Abbey was an example of the link between the Church in the kingdom of East Anglia and religious establishments in Francia.

Such associations were partly due to the work of Columbanus and his disciples at Luxeuil; together with Eustace, his successor, Columbanus inspired Burgundofara to found the abbey at Faremoutiers. It has been suggested that a connection between the disciples of Columbanus (who strongly influenced the Christians of Northern Burgundy) and Felix helps to explain how the Wuffingas dynasty established its links with Faremoutiers.

The historian N. J. Higham notes several suggestions for where Felix may have originated, including Luxeuil, Châlons or the area around Autun. Other historians have made connections between Felix and the Burgundian king Dagobert I, who had contact with both King Sigeberht of East Anglia and Amandus, a disciple of Columbanus.

The historians Judith McClure and Roger Collins have noted the possibility that Felix, who was already consecrated as a bishop in Burgundy, may have become a political fugitive in Francia before his arrival in East Anglia. A bishop named Felix held the see of Châlons in 626 or 627, but was deprived of his see following the death of the Frankish king Chlothar II in 629.

== Arrival in the kingdom of the East Angles ==
Felix is first mentioned in the Anglo-Saxon Chronicle—a collection of annals compiled in the late 9th century—under the year 633. "Manuscript A" of the Chronicle states that Felix "preached the faith of Christ to the East Angles". Another version of the Chronicle, "Manuscript F", written in the 11th century in both Old English and Latin, elaborates upon the short statement contained in "Manuscript A":

"Here there came from the region of Burgundy a bishop who was called Felix, who preached the faith to the people of East Anglia; called here by King Sigeberht; he received a bishopric in Dommoc, in which he remained for seventeen years."

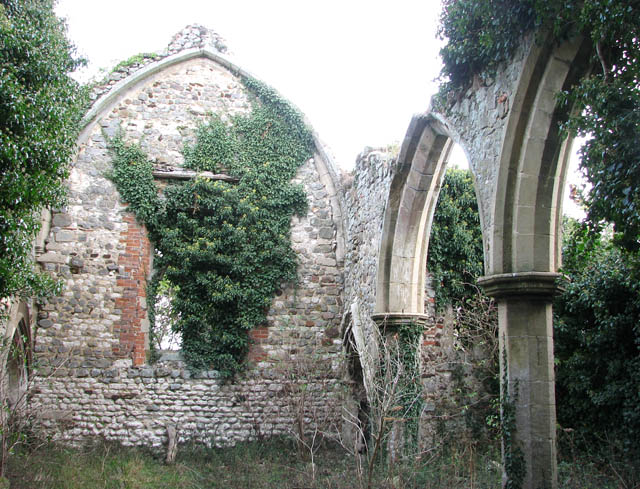
The late medieval remains of the parish church in Babingley, Norfolk. One of three churches in East Anglia dedicated to the saint, the dedication suggests that a pre-Conquest church once existed at or nearby to the site.

According to Bede, Felix was sent to promote Christianity in the land of the East Angles by the Archbishop of Canterbury, Honorius. Bede wrote of the exertions of Sigeberht, king of the East Angles:

"As soon as he began to reign he made it his business to see that the whole kingdom shared his faith. Bishop Felix most nobly supported his efforts. This bishop, who had been born and consecrated in Burgundy, came to Archbishop Honorius, to whom he expressed his longings; so the archbishop sent him to preach the word of life to this nation of the Angles."

Among the East Anglian traditions associated with Felix, one relates that he founded the church in Babingley, Norfolk, in 631 when he arrived there to convert the East Angles. The ruins stand about 200 metres (660 ft) north of where a navigable estuary once existed, and where Felix is said to have landed.

Sigeberht was the first English ruler to receive baptism before becoming king. Probably a son of Rædwald (ruled 599 to 624) and the brother of Rædwald's successor, Eorpwald, he was forced into exile during Rædwald's rule, after which he became a devout Christian and a man of learning. In about 627, Eorpwald was killed by Ricberht, who then ruled the East Angles for three years. Sigeberht became king of the East Angles after Richberht's death in 630. According to the historian Marios Costambeys, Felix's arrival in East Anglia seems to have coincided with the start of a new period of order established by Sigeberht when he became king. Costambeys adds that Sigeberht's accession may have been the reason Honorius decided to send Felix to East Anglia. Peter Hunter Blair challenged the assertion by mediaeval sources that spoke of Felix and Sigeberht travelling together from Francia to England, as in his view the text of the Ecclesiastical History of the English People can be taken to mean that Felix went to East Anglia because he was prompted to by Honorius.

== Bishop of the East Angles ==
Soon after his arrival at Sigeberht's court, in about 630 or 631, Felix established his episcopal see at Dommoc, which is widely considered by scholars to have been Dunwich, Suffolk, a thriving town in the Middle Ages. Dunwich has since been destroyed by the effects of coastal erosion. The historian Richard Hoggett has suggested that Felix's see was at Walton Castle, near Felixstowe, where a Roman fort once existed. According to Hoggett, "Walton Castle [was] a fitting site for the king's new bishopric and one which he was well within his rights to gift to Felix", being located near the Deben valley, where both the royal vill at Rendlesham and the burial-ground at Sutton Hoo were sited. A church and priory were dedicated to Felix at Walton by Roger Bigod, 1st Earl of Norfolk, soon after 1106.

Bede related that Felix started a school, "where boys could be taught letters", to provide Sigeberht with teachers. Bede is unclear as to the origin of the teachers at the school that Felix established; they may have been from kingdom of Kent, where a system of educating youngsters to become priests had been in existence since the Augustinian mission of 597, and where education was used to promote Christian learning throughout all levels of society. There is no evidence that Felix's school was at Soham Abbey, as stated by later sources. The Liber Eliensis mentioned that Felix also founded Soham Abbey and a church at Reedham, Norfolk: "Indeed, one reads in an English source that St Felix was the original founder of the old monastery of Sehem and of the church at Redham". According to the historian Margaret Gallyon, the large size of the East Anglian diocese would have made the foundation of a second religious establishment at Soham "appear very probable".

Bede praised Felix, writing that he had freed "the whole of this kingdom from long-standing evil and unhappiness". During his years as bishop, the East Anglian Church was made still stronger when the Irish monk Fursey arrived from Ireland and founded a monastery, at Cnobheresburg, probably located at Burgh Castle, in Norfolk.

== Death and veneration ==
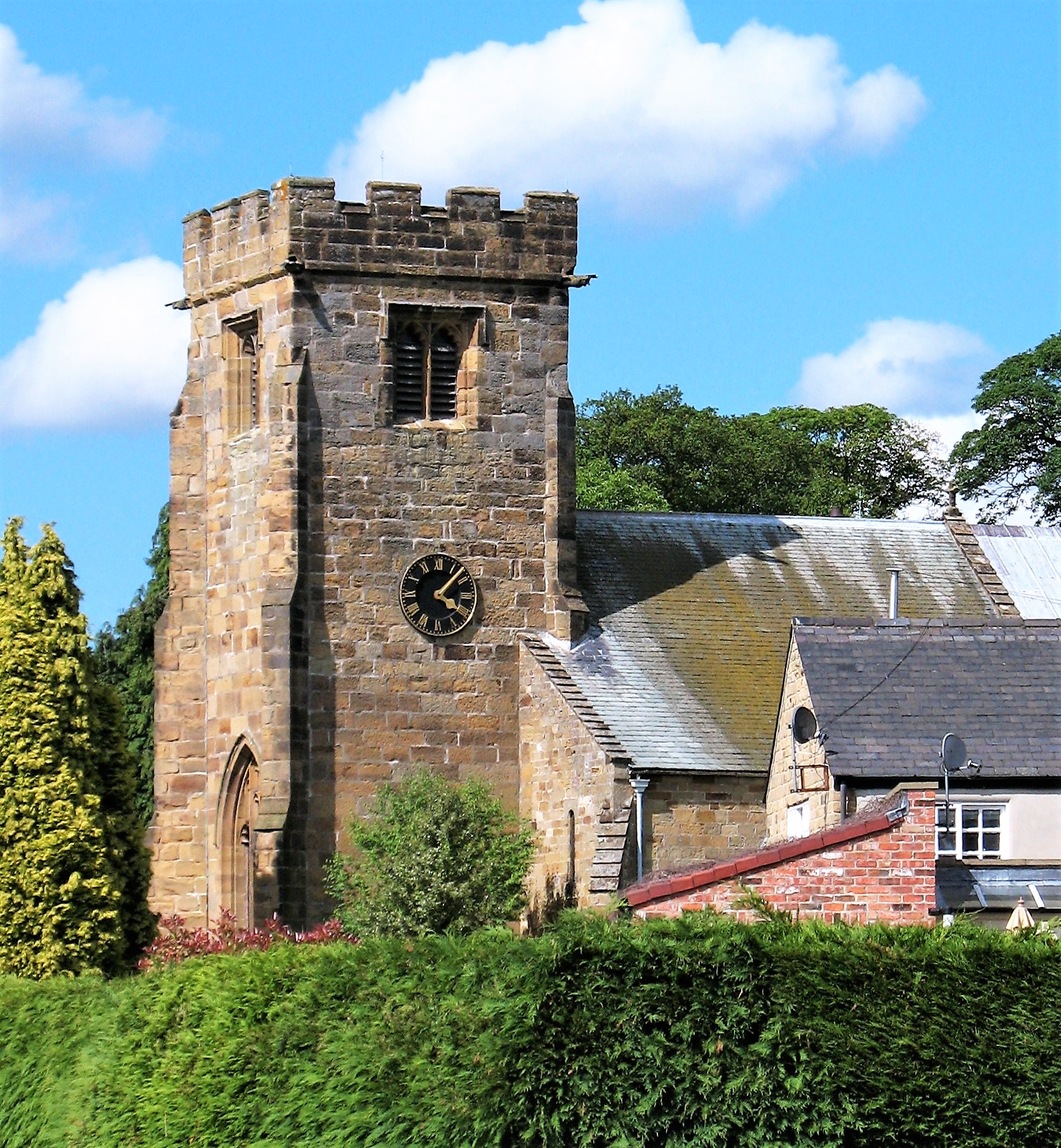
St Felix's Church, Felixkirk, Yorkshire. The building dates from the 12th century.

Felix died in 647 or 648, after he had been bishop for 17 years. Following his death, which probably occurred during the reign of Anna of East Anglia, Thomas, a Fenman, became the second Bishop of the East Angles.

Felix was buried at Dommoc, but his relics were at a later date removed to Soham, according to the 12th-century English historian William of Malmesbury. His shrine was desecrated by the Vikings when the church was destroyed. According to William, some time later "the body of the saint was looked for and found, and buried at Ramsey Abbey". Ramsey was noted for its enthusiasm for collecting saints' relics, and in an apparent attempt to get the better of their rivals from the abbey at Ely, the Ramsey monks escaped by rowing their boats through thick Fenland fog, carrying with them the bishop's precious remains.

Felix's feast day is celebrated on 8 March, the date given by two Anglo-Saxon kalendars. He was canonized before the Schism of 1054, early enough to be venerated in both the East and the West. There are six churches in England dedicated to the saint, all located in either North Yorkshire or East Anglia.

Felix is remembered in the Church of England with a commemoration on 8 March. The Yorkshire village of Felixkirk and the town of Felixstowe may both have been named after the saint, though an alternative meaning for Felixstowe, "the stow of Filica", has been suggested.

In the Catholic Church in England, Felix is one of the patron saints of the Diocese of East Anglia.

An effigy in Norwich Cathedral is thought to be of Felix.

== Sources ==
- Baker, Peter S. (2000). The Anglo-Saxon Chronicle: A Collaborative Edition: MS. F. Vol. 8. Bury St Edmunds, UK: St Edmundsbury Press. ISBN 978-0-85991-490-1.
- Bede (1999) [731]. McClure, Judith; Collins, Roger (eds.). The Ecclesiastical History of the English People. Oxford: Oxford University Press. ISBN 978-0-19-283866-7.
- Blair, Peter Hunter (1990). The World of Bede. Cambridge: Cambridge University Press. ISBN 978-05213-9-819-0.
- Butler, Alban (1999). Butler's Lives of the Saints (March). Collegeville, Minnesota: The Liturgical Press. ISBN 978-0-8146-2379-4.
- Costambeys, Marios (23 September 2004). "Felix [St Felix]". In Watt, Norma (ed.). Oxford Dictionary of National Biography (online ed.). Oxford: Oxford University Press. doi:10.1093/ref:odnb/9253. (Subscription, Wikipedia Library access or UK public library membership required.)
- DeWindt, Anne Reiber; DeWindt, Edwin Brezette (2006). Ramsey: The Lives of an English Fenland Town, 1200-1600. Vol. 1. Washington, D.C.: The Catholic University of America Press. ISBN 978-0-8132-1424-5.
- Ekwall, Eilert (1960). The Concise Oxford Dictionary of English Place-names. Oxford: Oxford University Press. ISBN 978-0-19-869103-7.
- Fairclough, John; Plunkett, Steven J. (2000). "Drawings of Walton Castle and Other Monuments in Walton and Felixstowe" (PDF). Proceedings of the Suffolk Institute of Archaeology and History. 39 (4). Ipswich, UK: The Five Castles Press Limited: 419–459. ISSN 0262-6004.
- Fairweather, Janet, ed. (2005). Liber Eliensis. Woodbridge, UK: Boydell Press. ISBN 978-1-84383-015-3.
- Fryde, E.B.; Greenway, D.E.; Roy, I.; Porter, S. (1996). Handbook of British Chronology. Cambridge: Cambridge University Press. ISBN 978-05215-6-350-5.
- Gallyon, Margaret (1973). The Early Church in Eastern England. Lavenham, UK: Terence Dalton. ISBN 978-0-900963-19-3.
- Grossi, Joseph (2021). Angles on a Kingdom: East Anglian Identities from Bede to Ælfric. Toronto: University of Toronto Press. ISBN 978-14875-0-573-8.
- Higham, N. J. (1997). The Convert Kings: Power and Religious Affiliation in Early Anglo-Saxon England. Manchester; New York: Manchester University Press. ISBN 978-0-7190-4828-9.
- Hoggett, Richard (2010). The Archaeology of the East Anglian Conversion. Woodbridge, UK: The Boydell Press. ISBN 978-1-84383-595-0.
- Kirby, D. P. (2000). The Earliest English Kings. New York: Routledge. ISBN 978-0-415-24211-0.
- Lapidge, Michael (1997). Columbanus: Studies on the Latin Writings. Woodbridge, UK: Boydell Press. ISBN 9-780-85115-667-5.
- Orme, Nicholas (2006). Medieval Schools: From Roman Britain to Renaissance England. New Haven, Connecticut; London: Yale University Press. ISBN 978-03001-1-102-6.
- Pestell, Tim (2004). Landscapes of Monastic Foundation: the Establishment of Religious Houses in East Anglia circa 650-1200. Woodbridge, UK: Boydell Press. ISBN 978-1-84383-062-7.
- Phillips, Andrew (2000). The Story of St. Felix, Apostle of East Anglia (PDF). Felixstowe, UK: The English Orthodox Trust. ISBN 978-3-940641-01-4.
- Plunkett, Steven (2005). Suffolk in Anglo-Saxon Times. Stroud: Tempus. ISBN 978-0-7524-3139-0.
- Preest, David (2002). William of Malmesbury's The Deeds of the Bishops of England. Woodbridge, UK: Boydell Press. ISBN 978-0-85115-884-6.
- Swanton, Michael, ed. (1997). The Anglo-Saxon Chronicle. London: Routledge. ISBN 978-0-415-92129-9.
- Warner, Peter M. (1996). The Origins of Suffolk. Manchester: Manchester University Press. ISBN 978-07190-3-817-4.
- Wood, Ian; Lund, Neils; Sawyer, Peter Hayes (1996). People and Places in Northern Europe, 500–1600: Essays in Honour of Peter Hayes Sawyer. Woodbridge, UK: Boydell Press. ISBN 978-0-85115-547-0.
- Yorke, Barbara (2002). Kings and Kingdoms of Early Anglo-Saxon England. London and New York: Routledge. ISBN 978-0-415-16639-3.
