= The Suffolk Traveller =

The Suffolk Traveller, was first published by John Bagnall of Ipswich in 1735 and included the first single county roadbook. It was written by the surveyor and topographer John Kirby (1690 – 1753).

It was the product of Kirby's systematic survey of the county conducted between 1732 and 1734, whereas up until then most county maps across England had been copied from the earlier maps by Christopher Saxton (c. 1540 – c. 1610).

A second edition was printed for J. Shave in the Stationer's Arms, in the Butter-Market, Ipswich and sold by T. Longman in Pater-noster Row, London
