= Eorpwald of East Anglia =

Eorpwald
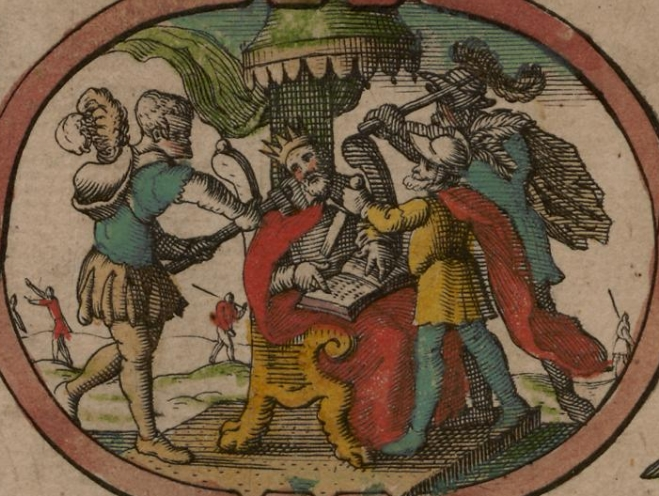
- An imaginary depiction of Eorpwald's murder from John Speed's 1611 Saxon Heptarchy.

King of the East Angles
- Reign: from c. 624
- Predecessor: Rædwald
- Successor: possibly Ricberht
- Died: assassinated c. 627 or 632
- Dynasty: Wuffingas
- Father: Rædwald
- Religion: Syncretic pagan-Christian

Eorpwald; also Erpenwald or Earpwald, (reigned from c. 624, assassinated c. 627 or 632), succeeded his father Rædwald as King of the East Angles. Eorpwald was a member of the East Anglian dynasty known as the Wuffingas, named after the semi-historical king Wuffa.

Little is known of Eorpwald's life or of his short reign, as little documentary evidence about the East Anglian kingdom has survived. The primary source for Eorpwald is the Ecclesiastical History of the English People, written by Bede in the 8th century. Soon after becoming king, Eorpwald received Christian teaching and was baptised in 627 or 632. Soon after his conversion he was killed by Ricberht, a pagan noble, who may have succeeded him and ruled for three years. The motive for Eorpwald's assassination was probably political as well as religious. He was the first early English king to suffer death as a consequence of his Christian faith and was subsequently venerated by the Church as a saint and martyr.

In 1939, a magnificent ship-burial was discovered under a large mound at Sutton Hoo, in Suffolk. Although Rædwald is usually considered to have been buried with the ship (or commemorated by it), another possibility is Eorpwald. Alternatively, he might also have had his own ship-burial nearby.

== Background and family ==
A map showing the general locations of the Anglo-Saxon peoples around the year 600

By the beginning of the 7th century, southern England was almost entirely under the control of the Anglo-Saxons. These peoples, who are known to have included Angles, Saxons, Jutes and Frisians, began to arrive in Britain in the 5th century. By 600, a number of kingdoms had begun to form in the conquered territories, including the Kingdom of the East Angles, an Anglo-Saxon kingdom which today includes the English counties of Norfolk and Suffolk. Almost no documentary sources exist about the history of the kingdom before the reign of Rædwald, who reigned until about 624. Sources of information include the names of a few of the early Wuffing kings, mentioned in a short passage in Bede's Ecclesiastical History of the English People, written in the 730s.

In 616, Rædwald defeated and killed Æthelfrith of Northumbria in the Battle of the River Idle and then installed Edwin as the new Deiran king. Whilst Edwin had been an exile at Rædwald's court, he had had a dream where he was told that if he converted to Christianity, he would become greater than any that had ruled before him. Steven Plunkett relates that, according to the version of events as told in the Whitby Life of St Gregory, it was Paulinus who visited Edwin and obtained his promise to convert to Christianity in return for regal power. After Edwin emerged as the ruler of Deira, with its centre at York, he became accepted as king of the northern Northumbrian province of Bernicia. Following his victory over the Northumbrians, Rædwald was not only king of the East Angles, but also the most powerful king amongst the rulers of the various English kingdoms, occupying the role which was later described by the term Bretwalda. He is thought by many to have been buried in the sumptuous ship burial at Sutton Hoo.

Eorpwald was the son of Rædwald by a wife whose name is not recorded. He had at least one brother, Rægenhere, and another sibling, Sigeberht, may also have been his brother. Rædwald used the letters R and E when naming two of his own sons (as did his own father when he and his younger brother Eni were named), which suggests that Eorpwald was the younger sibling and would only have become Rædwald's heir after his elder brother Rægenhere was slain in battle in 616. It is unclear whether, as Bede understood, Sigebert and Eorpwald were brothers, or whether they shared the same mother but not the same father, as was stated by the 12th-century chronicler William of Malmesbury. According to the historian Barbara Yorke, Sigebert may have been a member of a different line of Wuffings who, as his rival, was forced into exile, in order to ensure that Eorpwald became king.

== Accession and conversion to Christianity ==
Eorpwald was still a pagan when he became king of the East Angles, following the death of Rædwald in around 624. D. P. Kirby maintains that Sigeberht fled from East Anglia to Gaul during the internal strife that followed Eorpwald's accession and that the new king's paganism created tension between Christian and pagan factions within the kingdom, which resulted in a reduction in his influence. In 627, Edwin undertook the conversion of the peoples of Northumbria, Lindsey and East Anglia and at his prompting Eorpwald was, according to Bede, "persuaded to accept the Christian faith and sacraments". It can be calculated that this event occurred in 627, taking into account the years that Felix of Burgundy was known to have held the East Anglian bishopric. In contrast, the Anglo-Saxon Chronicle recorded that Eorpwald's baptism took place during 632: "Her wæs Eorpwald gefullod", ("Here Eorpwald was baptized").

It is not known whether Eorpwald was baptised in East Anglia, Northumbria or Kent, but it is very likely that Edwin, now the senior ruler, was present as his sponsor. Higham suggests that because of the lack of proper facilities in East Anglia, it is likely that he was baptised by Paulinus at Edwin's centre of authority in Northumbria. The manner of Eorpwald's conversion indicated that he was a subordinate king and that Edwin was his overlord.

Following his baptism, Edwin's Northumbrian priests were in a position to be able to suppress pagan practices in Eorpwald's kingdom and convert the East Anglians. The conversion had the general political benefit of bringing the entire eastern seaboard from Northumbria to Kent, with the exception of Essex, under the dominion of Edwin and his Christian allies.

== Death and sainthood ==
The conversion of Eorpwald's kingdom did not result in the establishment of any ecclesiastical infrastructure, such as the establishment of a see within the kingdom. Bede reported that soon after his conversion, Eorpwald was slain (occisus) by a heathen (uiro gentili) named Ricberht and that after he was killed, the kingdom reverted to heathen rule (in errore uersata est) for three years.

Eorpwald was the first English king to be killed because of his Christian faith. The circumstances are not recorded, so that it is not known whether Ricberht represented an internal East Anglian opposition to Christian rule, or if he was an emissary from abroad wishing to diminish Edwin of Northumbria's influence over the East Angles. The return of East Anglia to pagan rule does not necessarily mean that there was an overt struggle between the worship of the Anglo-Saxon gods and the worship of Christ, but could express a reaction against Christianity amongst the East Angles, prompted by Edwin's rise to power and his subsequent dominance over their king. The ancestry of Ricberht is unknown and it is unclear as to whether he ever ruled after he killed Eorpwald, but in 630 or 631, three years after Eorpwald's assassination, Sigeberht returned from exile in Gaul and became king of the East Angles.

At Sutton Hoo (near Woodbridge, in Suffolk) is the site of two 6th-7th century Anglo-Saxon cemeteries, where it is believed that members of Eorpwald's dynasty were entombed under large earth mounds. Several East Anglian kings, including Eorpwald, have been suggested as possible candidates for the occupant of the burial site under Mound 1, discovered in 1939. Martin Carver has speculated that historians could use regal lists and other sources of information to identify the occupants, whilst acknowledging that no material evidence exists to support the theory that Eorpwald or other members of his family are buried there. He has used Eorpwald's relationship as the son of Rædwald to place him in either Mound 1 or 2.

According to Fleming's Complete History of the British Martyrs, published in 1904, King Eorpwald was venerated as a saint and a martyr by the English Church. His feast day is not known.

== Sources ==
- "The Anglo-Saxon Chronicle: An Electronic Edition (Vol 5) literary edition: Manuscript E: Bodleian MS Laud 636". Archived from the original on 2009-02-12.
- Bede, Historia ecclesiastica gentis Anglorum, ed. and tr. Colgrave, Bertram; Mynors, Roger AB (1969). Bede's Ecclesiastical History of the English People. Oxford Medieval Texts. Oxford: Clarendon Press. ISBN 0-1982-2202-5.
- Carver, Martin (1998). Sutton Hoo: Burial Ground of Kings?. London: British Museum Press. ISBN 0-8122-3455-3.
- Fleming, William Canon (2003). Complete History of the British Martyrs: From the Roman Occupation to Elizabeth's Reign (1904). Kessinger. ISBN 0-7661-7370-4.
- Higham, N. J. (1997). The convert kings: power and religious affiliation in early Anglo-Saxon England. Manchester and New York: Manchester University Press. ISBN 0-7190-4828-1.
- Hoggett, Richard (2010). The Archaeology of the East Anglian Conversion. Woodbridge, Suffolk: The Boydell Press. ISBN 978-1-84383-595-0.
- Plunkett, Steven (2005). Suffolk in Anglo-Saxon Times. Stroud: Tempus. ISBN 0-7524-3139-0.
- Speed, John (1988). The Counties of Britain: a Tudor Atlas. London: Pavilion Books. p. 31. ISBN 1-85145-131-5.
- Stenton, Sir Frank (1988). Anglo-Saxon England. New York: Oxford University Press. ISBN 0-19-821716-1.
- Swanton, Michael (1997). The Anglo-Saxon Chronicle. London: Routledge. ISBN 0-415-92129-5.
- Wilson, David M. (1984). Anglo-Saxon: Art From The Seventh Century To The Norman Conquest. Thames and Hudson (US edition Overlook Press). p. 25.
- Yorke, Barbara (2003). Nunneries and the Anglo-Saxon Royal Houses. London and New York: Continuum. ISBN 0-8264-6040-2.

English royalty
Preceded by Raedwald	King of East Anglia; 625–627	Succeeded by Ricberht
