= Ricberht of East Anglia =

Ricberht

King of the East Angles (possibly)
- Reign: about 627–630
- Predecessor: Eorpwald
- Successor: Sigeberht with Ecgric
- Religion: Anglo-Saxon Paganism

Ricberht (Old English: Ricbyhrt), may have briefly ruled East Anglia, a small independent Anglo-Saxon kingdom which today forms the English counties of Norfolk and Suffolk. Little is known of his life or his reign.

According to Bede's Ecclesiastical History of the English People, Ricberht murdered Eorpwald of East Anglia in about 627, shortly after Eorpwald succeeded his father Rædwald as king and had then been baptised as a Christian. Following Eorpwald's death, Ricberht may have become king, a possibility that is not mentioned by Bede or any contemporary commentator. East Anglia then reverted to paganism for three years, before Sigeberht and Ecgric succeeded jointly as kings of East Anglia and ended the kingdom's brief period of apostasy.

== Background ==
North and east England in the 7th century

The earliest East Anglian kings were pagans. They belonged to the Wuffingas dynasty, named after Wuffa, whose ancestors originated from northern Europe and whose descendants ruled the East Angles in an almost unbroken line until after the reign of Ælfwald in the middle of the 8th century.

When East Anglia was first mentioned by Bede in his Ecclesiastical History of the English People, it was a powerful kingdom ruled by Rædwald (died about 624). According to Bede, Rædwald was recognised as exercising dominance or imperium over the southern Anglo-Saxon kingdoms, a position that was assured when he gave his loyalty and support to Edwin of Northumbria (who was at that time a fugitive at the East Anglian court) and together they defeated Æthelfrith of Northumbria on the banks of the River Idle, a tributary of the Trent. Rædwald was converted to Christianity in Kent at the invitation of King Æthelberht, but, under the influence of his pagan wife, his church contained both a Christian and a pagan altar. Upon his death in around 624, Rædwald was succeeded by his surviving son Eorpwald, who was then converted to the Christian faith shortly after becoming king. According to the historian N. J. Higham, Edwin of Northumbria and Paulinus of York, Edwin's bishop, were able to persuade Eorpwald to accept an "alien cult" whose authority rested outside East Anglia. Eorpwald may have been sponsored by King Edwin at his baptism, which would have resulted in Edwin being acknowledged as Eorpwald's lord. The East Angles may also have been baptised as a people, which would have undermined Eorpwald's authority as king and acted against the authority of any long-established pagan cults.

== The assassination of Eorpwald ==
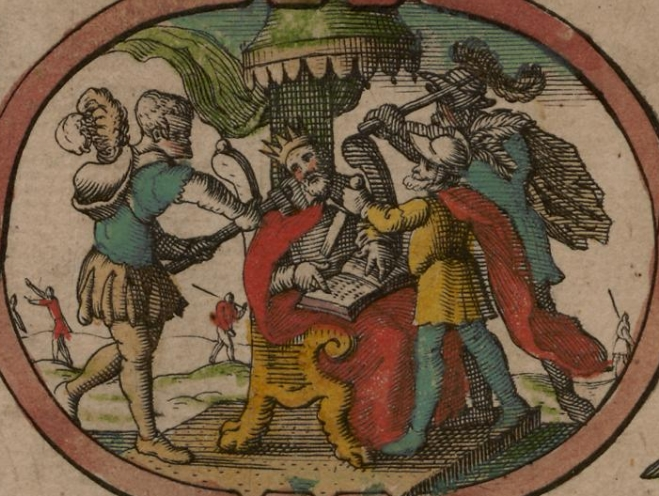
A depiction of Eorpwald's death, by John Speed

Soon after his conversion, Eorpwald was killed by Ricberht, possibly as the result of a pagan reaction to the East Anglian conversion. Nothing about Ricberht's ancestry or background is known, although his name can be taken to imply that he was a member of the East Anglian elite and was perhaps related to Eorpwald. The single source for Ricberht, Bede's Ecclesiastical History, states that "Eorpwald, not long after he had embraced the Christian faith, was slain by one Ricberht, a pagan;" ("Uerum Eorpuald non multo, postquam fidem accepit, tempore occisus est a uiro gentili nomine Ricbercto;"). It is not known where Eorpwald's murder occurred, nor any other details surrounding his death.

== Rule ==
Historians generally maintain that Ricberht, if he became king at all, succeeded Eorpwald and ruled for three years. Bede does not mention him again, only noting that "the province was in error for three years" ("et exinde tribus annis prouincia in errore uersata est"), prior to the accession of Eorpwald's half-brother (or brother) Sigeberht and his kinsman Ecgric.

Scholars have been unable to determine the regnal dates of several kings of this period, including that of Ricberht, with any certainty. Higham surmises that Ricberht's ability to rule for three years, at a time when Edwin was overlord among the Anglo-Saxons, implies that Ricberht was supported by the East Angles in overthrowing Eorpwald, whom they regarded as "overly compliant" towards the Northumbrian king.

It has been speculated by Michael Wood and other historians that Ricberht may have been interred in the Sutton Hoo ship-burial near the Wuffingas centre of authority at Rendlesham, but most experts consider Rædwald to be a more likely candidate. Martin Carver has used the evidence of what he identifies as iconic pagan practices at Sutton Hoo to theorise that the ship burial represents one example of pagan defiance "provoked by the perceived menace of a predatory Christian mission".

== Successors ==
In about 630, Christianity was permanently re-established in East Anglia when Sigeberht and Ecgric succeeded to rule jointly. Ecgric, who may have been a sub-king until the abdication of Sigeberht in around 634, seems to have remained a pagan. There is no evidence that Ecgric adopted or promoted Christianity: Bede wrote nothing to imply that he was a Christian, in contrast to his praise of the devout Sigeberht, the first English king to receive a Christian baptism and education before his succession.

== Sources ==
- Bede (1999). Ecclesiastical History of the English People. Oxford University Press. ISBN 0-19-283866-0. (available at Google Books)
- Higham, N. J. (1997). The Convert Kings: Power and Religious Affiliation in Early Anglo-Saxon England. Manchester: Manchester University Press. ISBN 0-7190-4828-1.
- Hoggett, Richard (2010). The Archaeology of the East Anglian Conversion. Woodbridge, Suffolk: The Boydell Press. ISBN 978-1-84383-595-0.
- Kirby, D.P. (2000). The Earliest English Kings. London and New York: Routledge. ISBN 0-4152-4211-8.
- Speed, John (1988). The Counties of Britain. London: Pavilion Books Ltd. ISBN 1-85145-131-5.
- Wood, Michael (2005). In Search of the Dark Ages. London: BBC. ISBN 978-0-563522768.
- Yorke, Barbara (2002). Kings and Kingdoms of Early Anglo-Saxon England. London and New York: Routledge. ISBN 0-415-16639-X.

English royalty
Preceded by Eorpwald	possible King of East Anglia c. 627 – 630	Succeeded by Sigeberht with Ecgric
