= Beodricesworth monastery =

Early Anglo-Saxon monastery later replaced by Bury St Edmunds Abbey

Beodricesworth Monastery
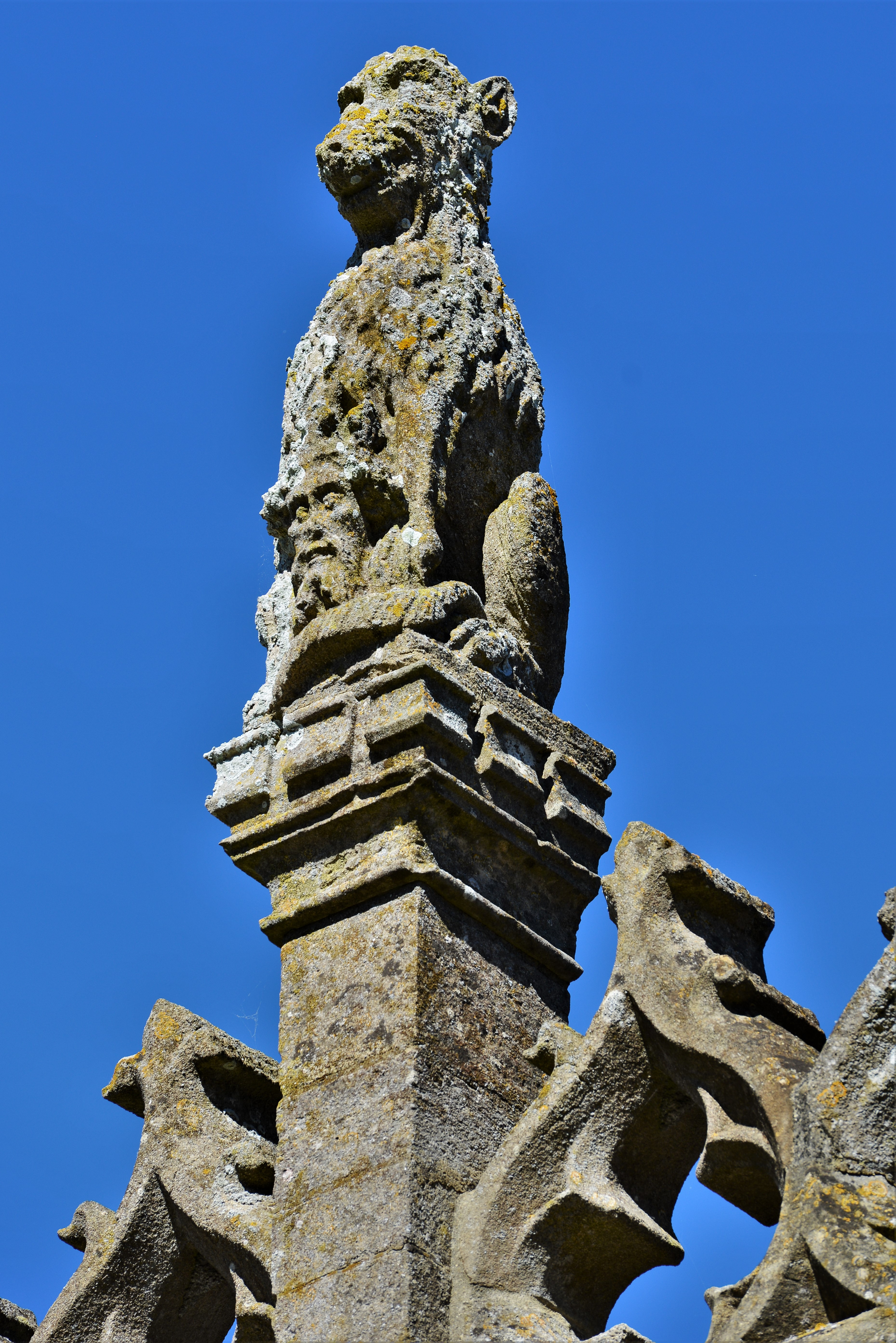
- The head of St. Edmund guarded by a wolf at Pulham St. Mary

- Location within England

Monastery information
- Order: Secular Canons
- Established: Possibly 7th century (by Sigeberht of East Anglia)
- Disestablished: Re-founded as Bury St Edmunds Abbey c.1020 by King Canute
- Dedication: Edmund the Martyr
- Diocese: Diocese of Elmham

People
- Founders: Possibly Sigeberht of East Anglia; re-founded by King Æthelstan

Site
- Location: Beodricesworth (modern-day Bury St Edmunds), Suffolk, England
- Coordinates: 52.2463°N 0.7192°E
- Public access: Ruins of the successor abbey are open to the public

Beodricesworth monastery was a monastery that would later become Bury St Edmunds Abbey.

The site probably (according to the Liber Eliensis) had a monastery founded by the East Anglian king Saint Sigeberht some three centuries earlier to which he had retired after abdicating.

Edmund the Martyr was a King of East Anglia who had been killed by the Viking Great Heathen Army, traditionally thought to be Ivar the Boneless, son of Ragnar Lodbrok, with his severed head thrown into the wood. As Edmund's followers searched for him, calling out "Where are you, friend?" the head answered, Her, her, her ("Here! Here! Here!") until at last they found it, clasped between a wolf's paws, protected from other animals and uneaten. The followers then recovered the head.

His incorrupt relics were venerated at a wooden chapel in Haegelisdun near to where he was killed.

At a date generally assumed by historians to have been during the reign of Æthelstan, who became king of the Anglo-Saxons in 924, Edmund the Martyr's body was translated to Beodricesworth. In 925 Æthelstan refounded a monastery at Beodricesworth to take care of Edmund's shrine, and the town changed its name to St Edmunds Bury. The chronicler Abbo of Fleury failed to date these events surrounding Edmund's translation to Beodericsworth, although from his text it can be seen that he believed that the relics had been taken to Beodericsworth by the time that Theodred became Bishop of London in around 926. At this time the early shrine was guarded by a group of secular priests.

Upon exhumation of the body, a miracle was discovered. All the arrow wounds upon Edmund's undecayed corpse had healed and his head was reattached.

In 942 or 945, King Edmund I had granted jurisdiction over the town of Bury St Edmunds to the abbot and convent, free from all secular services.

In 1010, Edmund's remains were translated to London to protect them from the Vikings, where they were kept for three years before being returned to Bury.

In c. 1020, under the auspices of King Canute and Ælfwine of Elmham, the then Bishop of Elmham, the group of secular priests was replaced by monks from St Benet's Abbey, and a Benedictine Abbey of St Edmundsbury was founded, free from control of a bishop.

== Bibliography ==
- Gransden, A (March 1994). "The Alleged Incorruption of the Body of St Edmund King and Martyr". The Antiquaries Journal. 74: 135–168. doi:10.1017/S0003581500024410.
- Farmer, David Hugh (2011). The Oxford Dictionary of Saints (5th revised ed.). Oxford, UK: Oxford University Press. ISBN 978-0-19-959660-7.
- Pinner, Rebecca (2015). The Cult of St Edmund in Medieval East Anglia (Hardcover). Woodbridge: Boydell Press. p. 276. ISBN 9781783270354.
- Ridyard, Susan J. (1988). The Royal Saints of Anglo-Saxon England: a Study of West Saxon & East Anglian Cults. Cambridge: Cambridge University Press. ISBN 978-0-521-30772-7.
- Young, Francis (2015). "St Sigebert: East Anglia's first martyr king".
- Young, Francis (2018). Edmund: In Search of England's Lost King. London: Bloomsbury. ISBN 978-17867-3-361-0.
