= Barbara Yorke =

British historian of Anglo-Saxon England (born 1951)

Barbara Yorke FRHistS
- Born: 1951 (age 74–75)
- Occupation: Emeritus Professor
- Known for: Kings and Kingdoms of Early Anglo-Saxon England; The Anglo-Saxons; The Conversion of Britain: Religion, Politics and Society in Britain, 600–800

Academic background
- Education: Exeter University (BA, PhD)

Academic work
- Discipline: History
- Institutions: University of Winchester

Barbara Yorke (born 1951, Barbara Anne Elizabeth Troubridge) is a historian of Anglo-Saxon England, specialising in many subtopics, including 19th-century Anglo-Saxonism. She is currently emeritus professor of early Medieval history at the University of Winchester, and is a fellow of the Royal Historical Society. She is an honorary professor of the Institute of Archaeology at University College London.

== Biography ==
Barbara Yorke, then Troubridge, attended Horsham High School for Girls. She studied history and archaeology at Exeter University, where she studied for both her undergraduate degree (1969–1972) and her Ph.D. At Exeter she studied with Professor Frank Barlow for medieval history classes, and Lady Aileen Fox for archaeology classes. Archaeologist Ann Hamlin and historian Mary Anne O'Donovan influenced Yorke's interest in the early Christian church.

Yorke started postgraduate study in 1973, supervised by Barlow and the early modern historian Professor Ivan Roots. Her thesis, “Anglo-Saxon Kingship in Practice 400–899”, was examined in 1978 by Henry Loyn, and the work "broke new ground in its consideration of the historical development of royal genealogies as well as opening up new lines of enquiry in the study of often fragmentary, laconic sources".

Yorke's first academic appointment was at King Alfred’s College (now the University of Winchester) in 1977, while she was writing up her Ph.D.

Yorke was appointed as Reader in 1993 and Professor of Early Medieval History in 2001, making her one of the 1,700 women to hold the position of professor out of 11,000 UK professors at the time.

Yorke presented "King Alfred and the traditions of Anglo-Saxon kingship" at the 2011 Toller Lecture.

A conference Saints, Rulers and Landscapes in Early Medieval Wessex was held in honour of Yorke's retirement at the Wessex Centre for History & Archaeology at the University of Winchester in September 2014. Some of the papers were published along with additional material as a Festschrift, The Land of the English Kin, edited by Ryan Lavelle and Alexander Langlands, both former students of Yorke.

== Scholarship ==
Yorke has made important contributions to the post-medieval reception of the Middle Ages, otherwise known as 'medievalism', especially concerning how the reputation and public image of King Alfred has developed from the post-Conquest period, through the Victorian era, to the present – a phenomenon she terms 'Alfredism'.

== Appointments ==
Yorke has held several high-profile academic appointments including

- Vice-President of the Royal Archaeological Institute
- Board of the International Society of Anglo-Saxonists
- Council of the Society of Antiquaries
- Member of the Fabric Advisory Committee to Winchester Cathedral

== Selected publications ==
- Kings and Kingdoms of Early Anglo-Saxon England. London, Seaby, 1990. ISBN 1-85264-027-8
- Wessex in the Early Middle Ages. Continuum International, 1995. ISBN 978-0-7185-1856-1
- Bishop Aethelwold: His Career and Influence. The Boydell Press, 1997. ISBN 978-0-85115-705-4
- The Anglo-Saxons. Sutton, 1999. ISBN 978-0-7509-2220-3
- The Millenary Celebrations of King Alfred in Winchester 1901. Hampshire Papers 17 (Winchester, 1999)
- Nunneries and the Anglo-Saxon Royal Houses. Continuum International, 2003. ISBN 0-8264-6040-2
- “Alfredism: The Use and Abuse of King Alfred’s Reputation in Later Centuries,” in Alfred the Great. Papers from the Eleventh-Centenary Conferences, ed. Timothy Reuter (Aldershot, 2003), pp. 361–80
- The Conversion of Britain: Religion, Politics and Society in Britain, 600–800. Longman, 2006. ISBN 0-582-77292-3
- “The ‘Old North’ From the Saxon South in Ninteteenth-Century Britain,” in Anglo-Saxons and the North, ed. Matti Kilpiö, Leena Kahlas-Tarkka, Jane Roberts, and Olga Timofeeva (Tempe, AZ, 2009), pp. 131–50.
