= Roman Norfolk =

This is part of a series on the History of Norfolk

Roman Norfolk began after the first contact by Julius Caesar in his expeditions of 55 and 54 BCE and the eventual invasion of England by Emperor Claudius in 43 CE. After this century of co-operation, during which the Roman client states held power, the infighting and other troubles led to the Roman invasion in 43 CE. The Iceni were in power in Norfolk during that period from 55 BCE to 43 CE and further problems between them led to eventual war between Boudica and the invading Romans.

== Norfolk pre 55 BCE ==
A shipwreck was discovered in 2010 off the coast of south Devon which is dated to around 900 BCE just before time of the transition from the Bronze Age to the Iron Age and is believed to have been coming to Britain from Europe. No hull remains were recovered, however the cargo found so far consisted of 259 Copper ingots, 27 tin ingots, 3 gold bracelets, several slingshots and a bronze leaf sword, which in those days was an extremely valuable cargo.

Although Bronze Age production was still under way when the Iron Age arrived in Britain around 600 BCE the change to Iron implements soon came. The Celts arrived in around 400 BCE and brought with them the first Iron Age tools for farming. These tools and other implements such as axes allowed more efficient methods of cutting and ploughing and so heavier soils could be turned allowing agriculture to spread.

This influx of Celts brought significant changes to the religious practices as well. It is about this time that the peoples of Britain first began to call themselves Britons. From around 350 BCE we find the start of burials as worship or offerings to the gods.

The first written records of Britain were produced by the Greek geographer Pytheas of Massilia (Marseilles) who sailed completely around the coast of Britain between 330 and 320 BCE. It is here that we learn of the Cornish tin trade with the Mediterranean and he also says that Britons were "peaceable but formidable in war" as well as describing horse drawn chariots which the Britons used in battle.

By 200 BCE the two metals were still being worked alongside.

Gold coins made in Gaul and other parts of France around 100 BCE have been found and coin production started in Britain around 70–80 BCE.

The people of Norfolk and the Iceni had a wide reaching trade with other parts of Britain as well as the European continent prior to the attempted invasion in 55 BCE. It is estimated that there may have been as many as 10 large boat trade journeys every week from the east coast. Norfolk people would have exported and imported items from Celtic countries including Spain and France and the Mediterranean. By 55 BCE the Roman Empire stretched from its western borders just across the English Channel in Gaul all the way to Artaxata in the east which is now called Artashat, Armenia near to the Mount Ararat in far east Turkey (level with the eastern Iranian border). The empire encompassed the whole of the Mediterranean spreading as far north as Scandinavia to Africa and Egypt in the south.

== Client state ==
After the Romans conquered Britain in 43 CE forts and roads were constructed around Norfolk as the Roman army became established. After a minor rebellion by the Iceni in 47 CE, king Prasutagus was allowed to rule independently as a client king. On his death in 60 CE Roman rule was imposed on the territory and his widow Boudica led a rebellion in which the towns of Colchester (Camulodunum), London (Londinium) and St Albans (Verulamium) were sacked.

== Boudica and the Iceni revolt ==
=== Background ===
Prasutagus was the king of the Iceni who inhabited what is now Norfolk. They initially were not part of the territory under direct Roman control having voluntarily allied themselves to Rome after Claudius' conquest in 43 CE. The Iceni guarded their independence and revolted in 47 CE when the governor Publius Ostorius Scapula threatened to disarm them. Prasutagus lived a long life of conspicuous wealth and, in hope of preserving his line, made the Roman emperor co-heir to his kingdom along with his wife Boudica and their two daughters.

Unfortunately for Boudica and the Iceni normal Roman practice was to incorporate a client state into the Roman Empire upon the client king's death. That plus the Roman Law which only allowed male heirs to inherit power sealed the fate of both the Iceni and Norfolk. When Prasutagus died the Romans moved in to take power and seize their assets. Boudica was flogged, her daughters were raped and the Romans took property and land to pay for the debt that Prasutagus had built up as, upon his death, his subjects had become liable for the outstanding monies.

== Roman rule ==
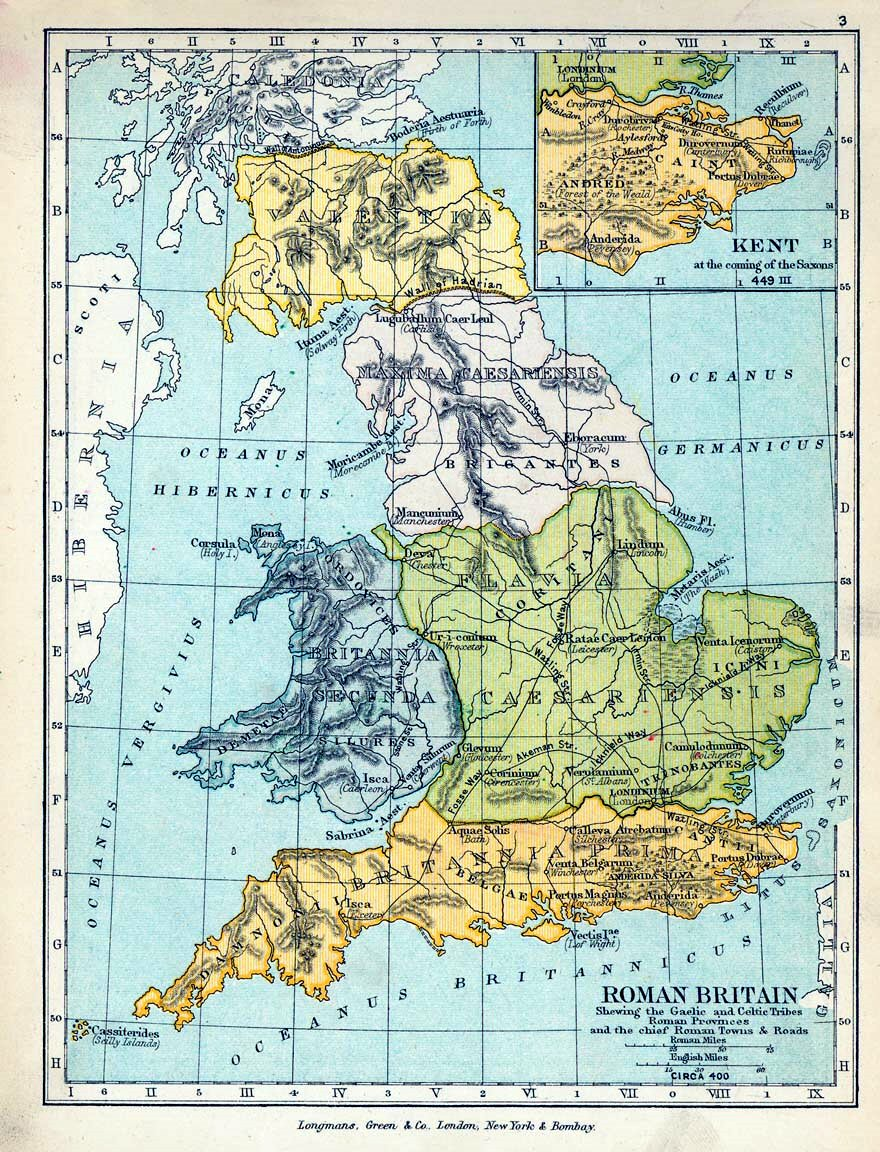
A 1905 map of Roman Britain, showing how the coastline of Norfolk has changed since Roman times.

Following the defeat of Boudicca, the Romans imposed their own order on the region, with an administrative centre established at Venta Icenorum (near the present Caistor St. Edmund), a smaller town being built at Brampton and other settlements developed at river crossings or road junctions. The mostly rural population lived in scattered homesteads, villages or more affluent Roman villas. The level of the sea fell during Roman times and the swampy region to the west of Norfolk slowly dried. The land was then able to be converted into fertile farmland where sheep-rearing and salt production could be established.

=== Forts ===
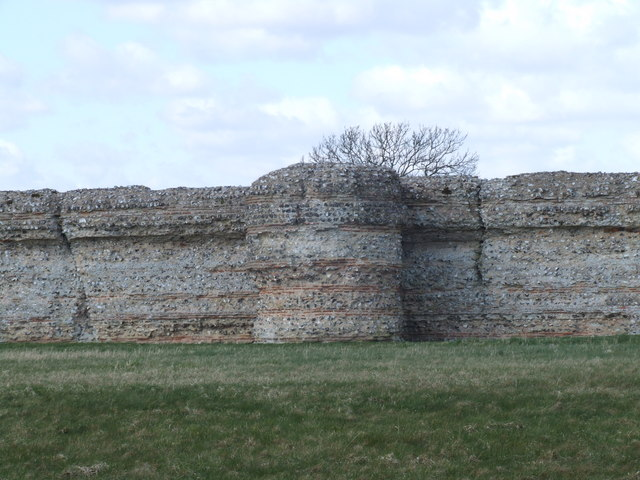
Burgh Castle is an impressive Roman ruin in Norfolk

== Fortification against the Saxons ==
The Saxon Shore forts were built by the Romans in the third century CE as a defence against Saxon raiders. In Norfolk the ruins of the fort built at Burgh Castle (possibly Roman Gariannonum), guarding the estuary across from the island of Flegg, still remain, but there is now little remaining of the forts at Brancaster (Branodunum) built on the north coast, and at Caister-on-Sea on the east coast, and close by to Burgh Castle. After the last of the armies of Rome left Britain in 410 CE, most of the visible remains of Roman Britain slowly disappeared.

== Sources ==
- Davies, John (2008). The Land of Boudica - Prehistoric and Roman Norfolk. Oxford: Oxbow Books. ISBN 978-1-905223-33-6.
- Wade-Martins, Peter, ed. (1994). An Historical Atlas of Norfolk. Norfolk Museums Service, Norwich in Association with the Federation of Norfolk Historical and Archaeological Organisations. ISBN 0-903101-60-2.
