= History of Norfolk =

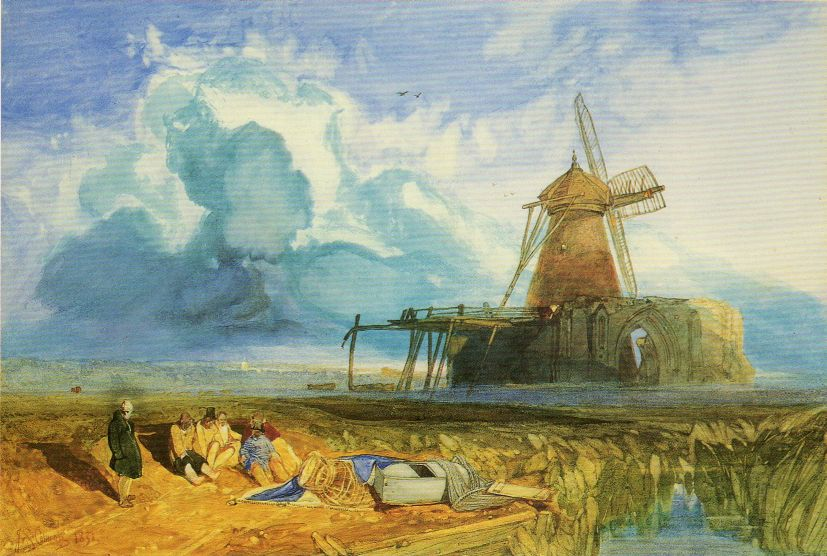
St Benet's Abbey, in a painting by John Sell Cotman (1783–1842). It was one of Norfolk's first monasteries and the only one in England to survive the dissolution of the monasteries in the 1530s.

Norfolk (/ˈnɔːrfək/ NOR-fək) is a rural county in the East of England. Knowledge of prehistoric Norfolk is limited by a lack of evidence – although the earliest finds are from the end of the Lower Paleolithic period. Communities have existed in Norfolk since the last Ice Age and tools, coins and hoards such as those found at Snettisham indicate the presence of an extensive and industrious population.

The Iceni tribe inhabited the region prior to the Roman conquest of Britain in 43 AD, after which they built roads, forts, villas and towns. Boudica's rebellion in 60 AD, caused by the imposition of direct rule by the Romans, was followed by order and peace, which lasted until the Roman armies left Britain in 410 AD. The subsequent arrival of the Anglo-Saxons caused the loss of much Roman and British culture in Norfolk. It is known from external evidence from excavations and place-names that by c. 800 AD all Norfolk had been settled and the first towns had emerged. Norfolk was the northern half of the Kingdom of East Anglia and was ruled by the Anglo-Saxon Wuffing dynasty. Our knowledge of several Wuffings is scant, as few historical documents of the period have survived.

Under the Normans, Norwich emerged as the hub of the region. With steady growth and strong overseas links it became an important mediaeval city, but it suffered from internal tensions, unsanitary conditions and disastrous fires. Mediaeval Norfolk was the mostly densely populated and the most productive agricultural region in the country. Land was cultivated intensively and the wool trade was sustained by huge flocks. Other industries such as peat extraction were important. Norfolk was a prosperous county and possessed a wealth of monastic establishments and parish churches.

== Etymology ==
The name "Norfolk" derives from terms which meant "the northern people". It is first mentioned in Anglo-Saxon wills dating from 1043 to 1045 and later as Norðfolc in the Anglo-Saxon Chronicle (the entry for 1075) and as Nordfolc in the Domesday Book.

== Prehistoric Norfolk ==
=== Paleolithic to Chalcolithic ===
==== Lower Paleolithic (2,500,000 to 300,000 BC) ====
In 2005 it was discovered that Norfolk contained one of the earliest finds of European man. The find revealed flint tools, similar to those found on the Suffolk coast at Pakefield which were dated at around 668,000 BC and a find at Happisburgh in the "Cromer Forest Bed" has been dated as being approximately 900,000 years old and has given us flints, footprints and the oldest hand axe to be found in north-west Europe.

==== Middle Paleolithic (300,000 to 30,000 BC) ====
In 2002 there was a major discovery of one of the most important sites of Neanderthal man, dated to around 58,000 BC, in the Thetford Forest at Lynford. David Miles the chief archaeologist at English Heritage said: "It is extremely rare to find any evidence of Neanderthals and even rarer to find it in association with mammoth remains. We may have discovered a butchery site, or what would be even more exciting, first evidence in Britain of a Neanderthal hunting site which would tell us much about their organisational and social abilities."

The site was found to contain organic material and a Mousterian hand axe was found in a good state of preservation. A further 30 Mousterian hand axes were found along with reindeer bones covered in cut marks. The animal remains have revealed the presence of woolly mammoths, woolly rhinoceros, brown bears, spotted hyenas and other smaller remains such as fish jaws, frog bones and several types of mollusc. Although the site contains such exotic animals the temperatures were still below those felt today as Norfolk was still in the clutches of the remnants of an Ice-Age. The average temperature in July has been estimated as 13 °C and the area would have been below freezing for most of the winter months. From plant and insect remains it has been deduced that the area was marshy and covered with small areas of open still water similar to the modern day broads.

==== Upper Paleolithic (40,000 to 10,000 BC) ====
During the last Ice age, reaching its greatest extent between 22,000 and 17,000 years ago, the so-called Last Glacial Maximum (LGM), the whole of Britain was either ice sheet or polar desert thus wiping out the entire gene pool. The return of pioneer groups, evidenced by the so-called Creswellian culture, began about 15,000 years ago.

==== Neolithic and Chalcolithic (9500 to 3000 BC) ====
This period covers the stages of change from the pottery of the stoneage into the age of metals. The Chalcolithic Age is the start of the Copper Age and marks the end of the time when people could only work mainly single element metals such as silver, tin, copper and gold. The Copper Age precedes the Bronze Age when metallurgy developed into a science capable of amalgamating metals into bronze and other compounds.

=== Bronze Age ===
(3000 to 600 BC)

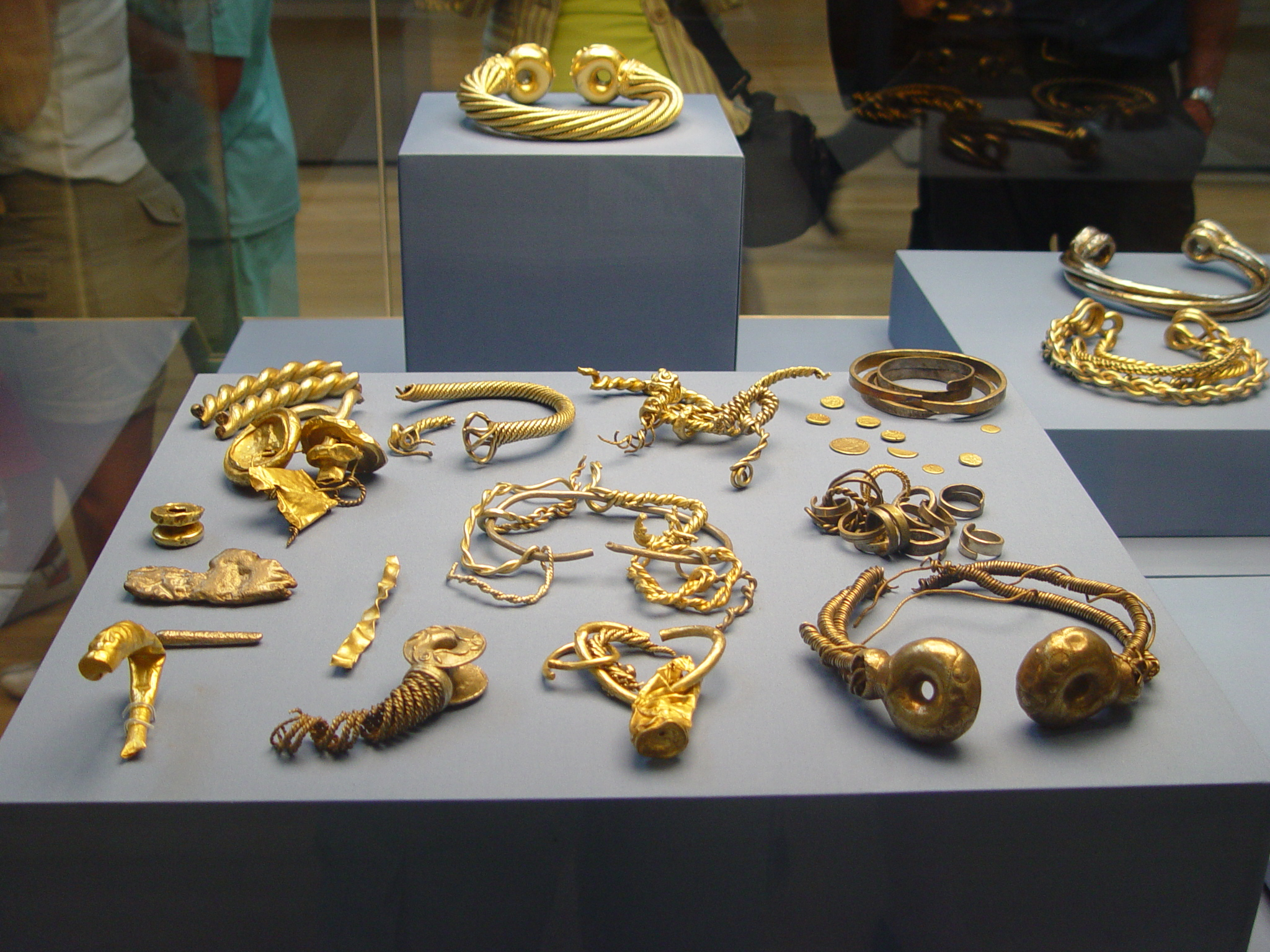
The Snettisham Hoard, now kept at the British Museum

Norfolk was a centre of metalworking and by the Late Bronze Age northern Norfolk had developed into a major area of production. There were also throwbacks to the earlier ages and one such type were the monuments. A significant find was discovered in 1998 between the high and low tidal limits off the north west coast of Norfolk at Holme-next-the-Sea. A ring of timbers was found and within it an upturned tree stump with its roots above the sand. The remains were excavated in 1999 and the samples taken dated it to 2049 BC. A find at Sutton (near Stalham) on 7 July 1875 revealed a copper alloy shield buried under peat lying on, and covered by, white sand. There have been numerous finds from all periods of the Bronze Age but amongst the most notable were a find of 141 axes heads at Foulsham and pottery including collared urns from the Witton Wood barrow.

Grimes Graves is a large and well-preserved group of Neolithic flint mines at a site near Brandon, consisting of 400 pits. It was first named Grim's Graves by the Anglo-Saxons and was first excavated in 1870 when the pits were first identified as mines dug over 5,000 years ago.

=== Iron Age ===
There is evidence that much of Norfolk was intensively farmed by people during the Late Iron Age. The Cenimagni tribe who submitted to Caesar in 54 BC were settled in both lowland and upland Norfolk by this time. They may have been centred in north-west Norfolk, where hoards of coins and torcs have been discovered such as that found at Snettisham. Coins found in the south of the county indicate that the Iceni tribe may have been centred around Thetford by the mid-1st century AD.

== Roman Norfolk ==
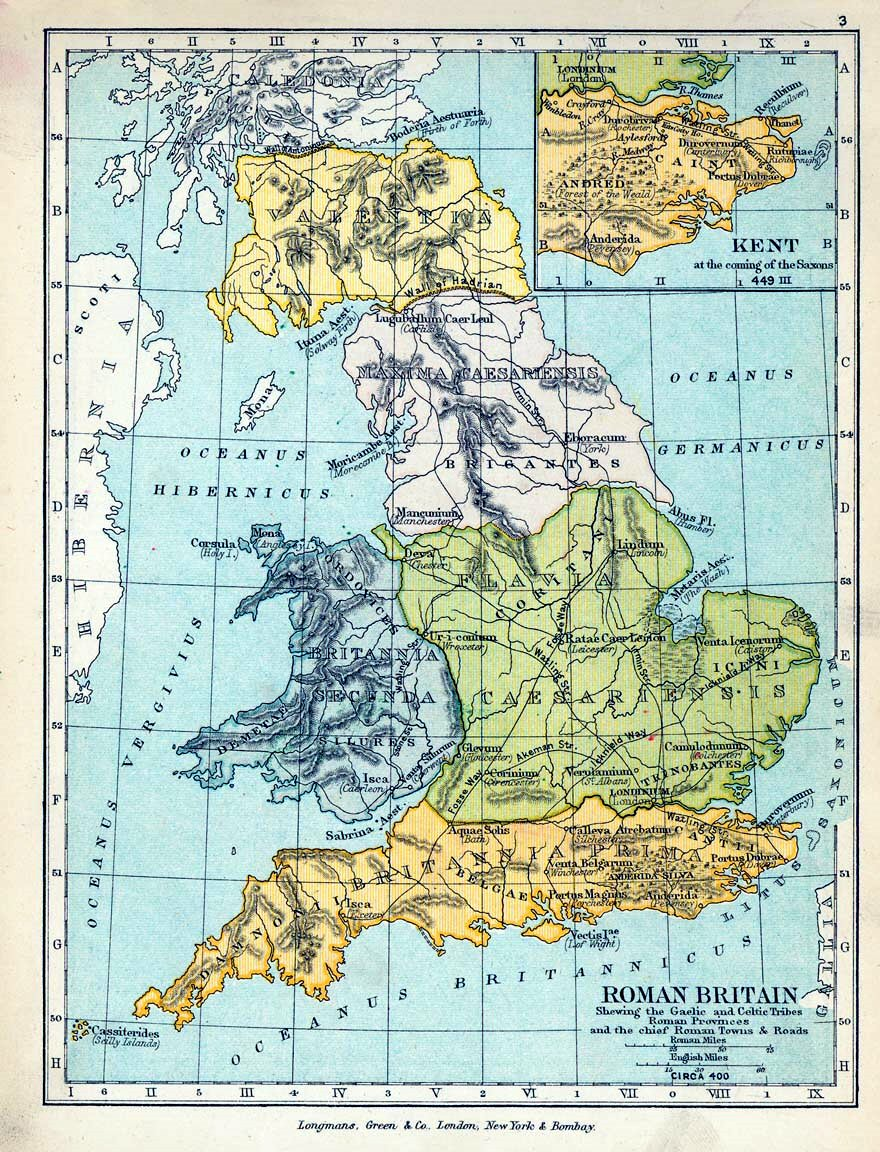
A 1905 map of Roman Britain

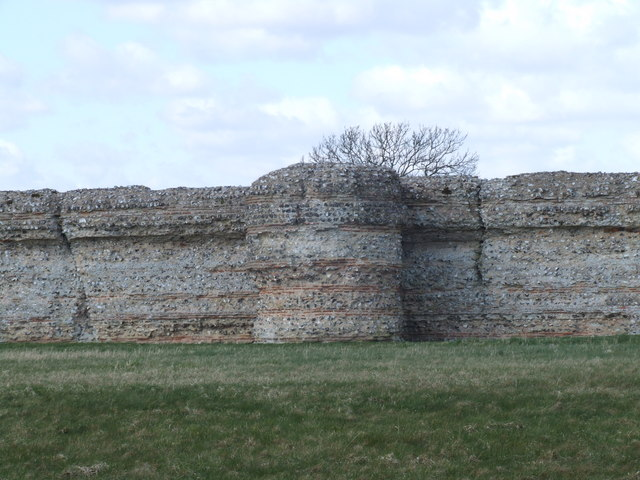
Burgh Castle, the most impressive of the Roman ruins of Norfolk

Norfolk's coastline is markedly different from the coastline that existed when the Romans first occupied what is now the county of Norfolk. The northern coast of Norfolk has eroded over the last two millennia, parts of it perhaps having retreated by up to 2 kilometres (1.2 mi). The eastern coast was dominated by an enormous estuary, the island of Flegg and a peninsula (modern Lothingland). The Wash was much larger in size and the area now known as the Fens was impenetrable marsh containing isolated islands surrounded by water. The River Waveney between Norfolk and Suffolk was at that time a substantial feature.

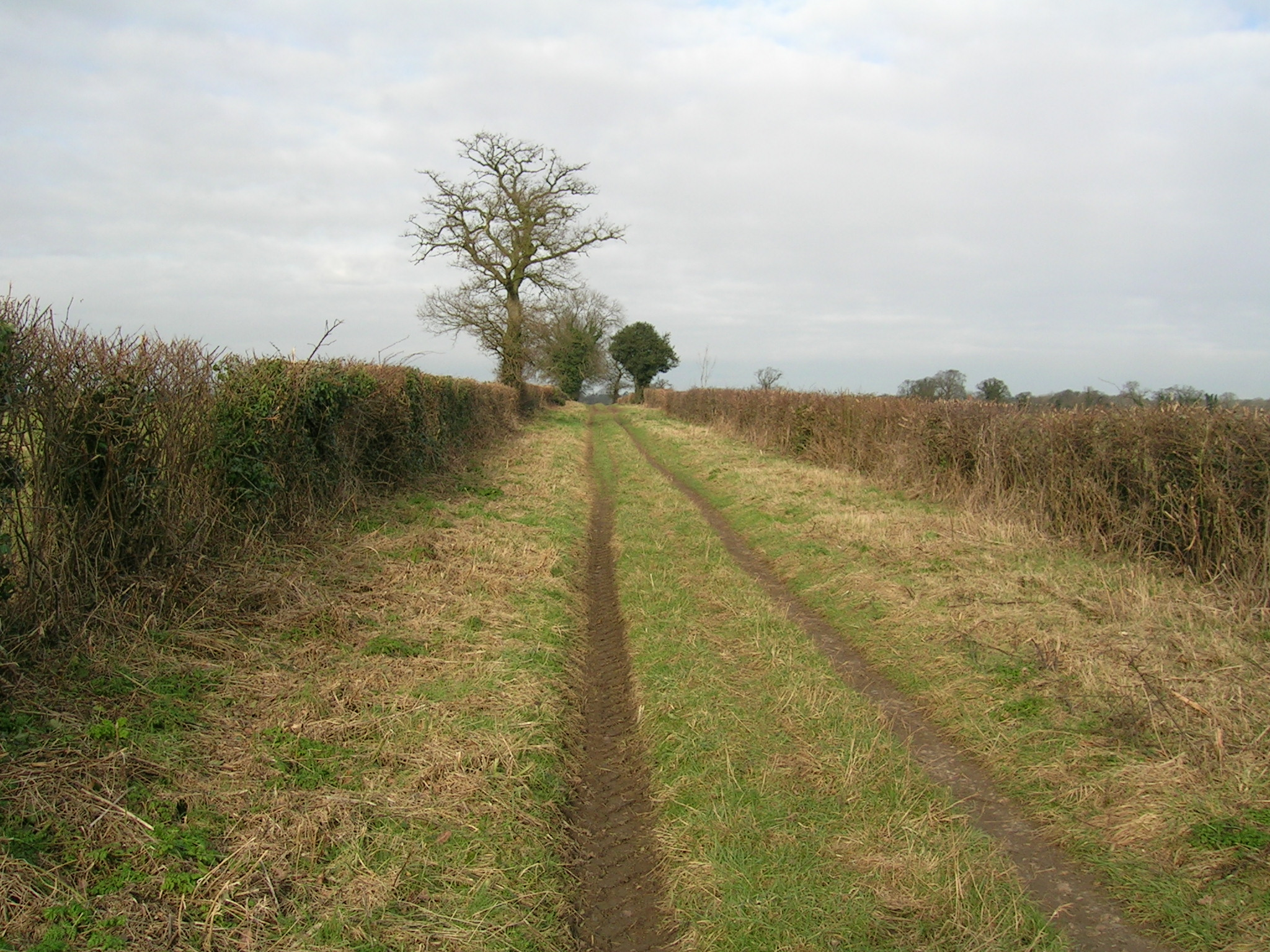
The Peddars Way footpath follows the route of a major Roman road across Norfolk.

After the Romans conquered Britain in 43 AD, forts and roads were constructed around Norfolk as the Roman army became established. Major Roman roads in the county included the Peddars Way and Pye Road. After a minor rebellion by the Iceni in 47 AD king Prasutagus was allowed to rule independently as a client king. On his death in 60 AD Roman rule was imposed on the territory and his widow Boudica was not allowed to succeed him as Roman law only allowed male heirs to claim a client king's title. After Boudica was humiliated and her daughters raped she led a rebellion in which the towns of Colchester (Camulodunum), London (Londinium) and St. Albans (Verulamium) were sacked.

Following the defeat of Boudicca the Romans restored order on the region by establishing an administrative centre at Venta Icenorum (the present Caistor St. Edmund), a small town built at Brampton and other settlements which were developed at river crossings or road junctions. The mostly rural population lived in scattered homesteads, villages or more affluent Roman villas. The level of the sea fell during Roman times and the swamps in the west of Norfolk slowly dried out. The land was then able to be converted into fertile farmland where sheep-rearing and salt production could be established.

The Saxon Shore forts were built by the Romans in the 3rd century AD as a defence against overseas raiders. In Norfolk the ruins of the forts built at Burgh Castle (Roman Gariannonum), guarding the estuary across from the island of Flegg, still exist, but there is now little remaining of the forts at Brancaster (Branodunum) built on the north coast, and at Caister-on-Sea, on the east coast and near Burgh Castle. After the last of the armies of Rome had left in 410 AD most of the visible remains of Roman Britain slowly disappeared.

== Anglo-Saxon Norfolk ==
=== Occupation and settlement ===
The kingdom of East Anglia during the early Saxon period

The area experienced a depopulation during the fourth century, possibly due to raids from Saxons and Picts. Around 410 AD, Germanic-speaking settlers began to arrive from north-west Europe, thus placing the first phases of the Anglo-Saxon settlement of Norfolk before the supposed landing of Hengist and Horsa in Kent in 449. The migration here likely occurred on a very large scale; however, archaeologist Toby Martin has stressed that the settlers did not arrive as part of a coherent tribal group, and that the self-identification of the people of the region as Angles seems to have emerged from a later period of ethnogenesis.

The new culture of the Anglo-Saxons replaced the culture of the Romans and ancient Britons. The number of Brittonic place names in this area is extremely low. Though the first written record of most of the place names in the county is the 11th-century Domesday Book, most were coined at a much earlier date. Places with names ending in -ham in Norfolk (but not those ending -ingham) are generally sited favourably by rivers or near fertile soil and grew in importance from large vills into the county's modern market towns. Comparatively less important settlements tended to end with the suffixes -ton, -wick or -stead. Excavations and place-name evidence indicates that the early Anglo-Saxons (pre-800 AD) seem to have occupied the south and south-west of Norfolk most densely, with settlements concentrated along river systems. A settlement and a cemetery at Spong Hill, containing both graves and inhumation pots, is an example of one of the earliest Anglo-Saxon sites to have been found in Norfolk. During the 7th century East Anglia adopted Christianity and the custom of burying grave goods, found at numerous sites, eventually ceased. Evidence of early Anglo-Saxon settlement exists in the form of Ipswich ware pottery and coins (sceattas) that are unique to the period.

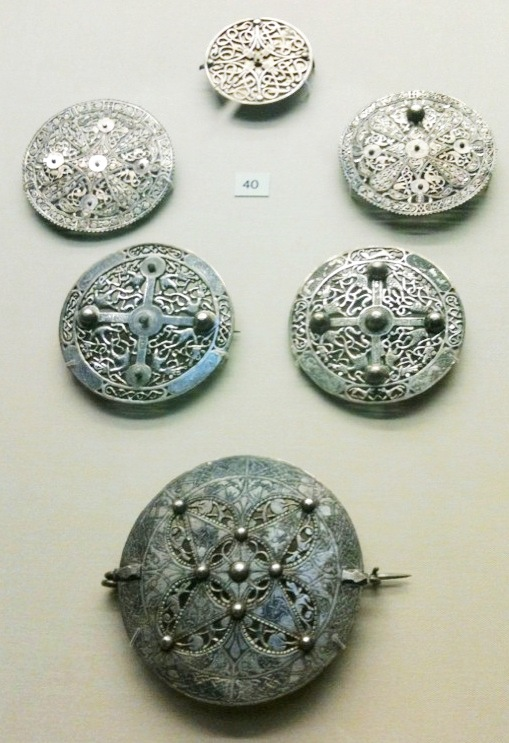
Late Anglo-Saxon brooches discovered at Pentney, now on display at the British Museum

The Anglo-Saxons eventually expanded across Norfolk. By 850 AD the majority of the county's current pre-Danish placenames had been created, although only two names – Deorham (modern West Dereham) and Cnobheresburgh (the site of an unidentified monastery on the east coast) – exist in early Anglo-Saxon documents. Evidence of the importance of the emerging trade settlements of Thetford and Norwich is still being discovered. Numerous other sites in the county have revealed evidence of Anglo-Saxon settlement, for instance at North Elmham (where there is evidence of timber buildings and roadways), or at Bawsey (with finds of pottery, coins and metalwork). Six late Anglo-Saxon silver brooches were discovered at Pentney in 1978, that may have belonged to a local maker or dealer.

Suggestions have been made that higher concentrations of Britons continued to live in the Fenlands. There, some place names containing putatively Celtic elements can be found, such as King's Lynn.

=== The kingdom of the East Angles ===
The Kingdom of the East Angles in about 600

Norfolk was part of the kingdom of the East Angles during much of the Anglo-Saxon period. Its history is largely obscure: much information is based on mediaeval chronicles and often cannot be verified. The history of Norfolk, the northern half of the kingdom, cannot be distinguished from the rest of East Anglia during this period.

East Anglia was first ruled by semi-historical kings from the Wuffings dynasty, who, according to the 9th-century Historia Brittonum of Nennius, descended to Wuffa of East Anglia from Wōden. In the Anglo-Saxon Chronicle, the most important historical source for the Anglo-Saxon period, only Rædwald of East Anglia and his successors Eorpwald, Anna, Æthelberht and Edmund the Martyr are mentioned. An important source of information is Bede's Historia ecclesiastica gentis Anglorum, which describes events during the reigns of several East Anglian kings, including Raedwald, the first king who is known by more than a name, concentrating particularly on the Christianisation of East Anglia.

The only surviving lists of the kings of East Anglia are those written by mediaeval sources, such as William of Malmesbury. Nothing is known about any of the kings from 664 to 747, after which the succession and genealogy of the kings of East Anglia after this time is uncertain. The Vikings attacked Norfolk in 865 and four years later killed Edmund, the last king of the East Angles. Villages on the former island of Flegg with names such as Scratby, Hemsby and Filby provide evidence of Viking settlement: other place-names of Viking origin are scattered around Norfolk. Viking settlement is thought to have stimulated the growth of towns such as Norwich and Thetford. After Edward the Elder conquered East Anglia and ended Viking domination in c. 917, the region was absorbed into the kingdom of England. The shires of Norfolk and Suffolk are generally thought to have been established following the 917 conquest, but the historian Lucy Marten argues that the shiring did not take place until the reign of Cnut (1016–1035).

== Medieval Norfolk ==
At the time of the Norman Conquest, Norfolk formed part of the earldom of Harold I of England and offered no active resistance to William the Conqueror, who bestowed the earldom of East Anglia on Ralph de Gael. After the Revolt of the Earls in 1075, Earl Ralph's estates were forfeited and passed to Roger Bigod.

=== Medieval Norwich ===
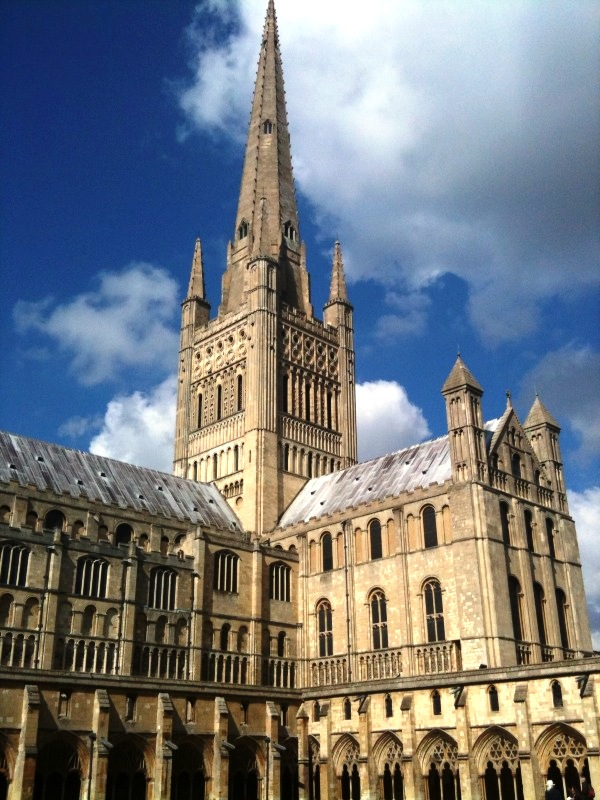
Norwich Cathedral, one of the great Norman buildings of England

The arrival of the Normans in 1066 led to the destruction of much of Anglo-Saxon Norwich. After Ralph de Gael rebelled against the king, a large part of the town was burned by the Normans in retribution. They then started to develop Norwich into a prosperous international port and a centre of Norman power. Norwich Castle was built by 1075. It was of a motte and bailey type and was rebuilt in stone before 1200. Work on the cathedral precinct started in 1096. Within it was built a cathedral church, a fortified bishop's palace and other monastic buildings. The formation of the precinct turned a large part of the town into an unpopulated area of quarry pits and building yards.

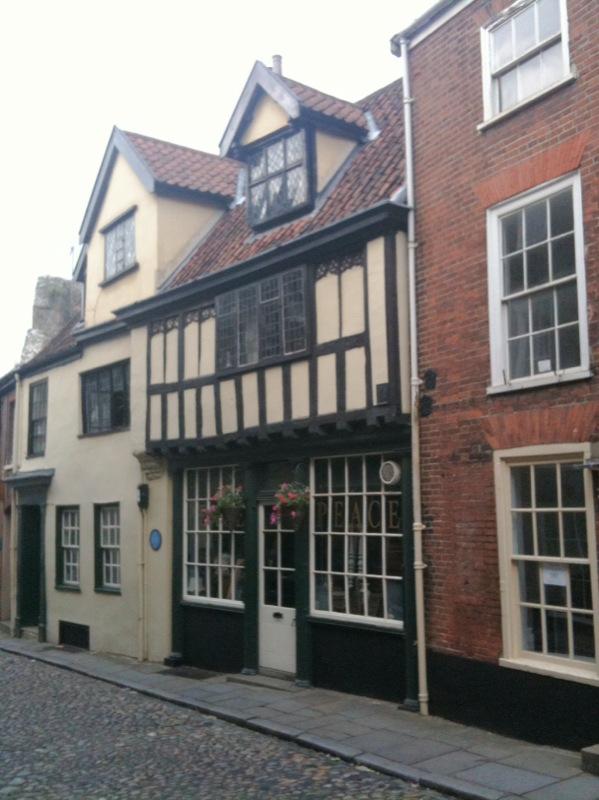
A mediaeval merchant's house on Elm Hill, Norwich

Early mediaeval Norwich grew into a cosmopolitan city and expanded around the waterfront and westwards along St. Benedict's Street. During the 12th century there was a thriving Jewish community, but it was unpopular with the Christian population. In 1144 the Jews were accused of the ritual murder of a young boy named William, who was subsequently canonized. Their synagogue was destroyed in 1286 and four years later all the Jews in England were expelled from the country (see Edict of Expulsion).

Tensions between the cathedral priory and the citizens of Norwich (in part over the jurisdiction of land in the city) culminated in the Riot of 1272, in which thirteen members of the priory were murdered and the precinct gates and St. Ethelbert's Church were destroyed. As punishment, the main anarchists were put to death and the city lost its liberties and was forced to pay for the building of a new gate for the priory.

Between 1297 and 1344 a new defensive wall was constructed on the huge banks that surrounded the city, replacing the earlier palisade and gates. The area enclosed was the largest for any city in England, although inside was a considerable amount of pasture land, which was slowly absorbed as new monastic settlements, houses, markets and industrial sites appeared. By 1400 Norwich had grown to become a major city of perhaps 10,000 inhabitants.

The Black Death may have killed two fifths of the population of the city. It led to efforts to improve the unsanitary conditions, but these had little impact. Immigration from the surrounding countryside soon restored pre-plague numbers, partly as a result of the growing textiles industry. Growing civic wealth and pride was reflected in new large buildings such as the Guildhall, built from 1407 to 1453. During the later mediaeval period, Norwich's fortunes declined. Both the fires of 1412 and 1413 (which destroyed many of the city's buildings) and the Wars of the Roses, contributed to its decline. The period is characterised by a growing gap between the wealthy and the poor of Norwich.

=== Rural Norfolk during the Middle Ages ===
Hickling Broad, from Jerrold's 1910 Norwich and the Broads. The Broads were created when huge peat excavations were flooded during the Middle Ages.

In the 14th century Norfolk was the most densely populated and most intensively farmed region in England. The land was predominantly arable, much more so than in previous centuries. Where land could not be ploughed easily, it was managed as pasture. The woodlands of much of Norfolk were cleared during mediaeval times. The soils of the county were variously light, heavy and – most valuably – moderate. The moderately heavy soils were concentrated in central and eastern parts. Crops grown included barley (for making beer), rye, oats and peas. Horses were introduced sooner in Norfolk than elsewhere and crop rotation helped to intensify cultivation. Manorial records show that the types of crops cultivated and animals stocked depended on access to markets, labour supply, freedom from communal controls and transport costs, as well as soil type. In comparison to its arable land, Norfolk's pastures and meadows were less productive.

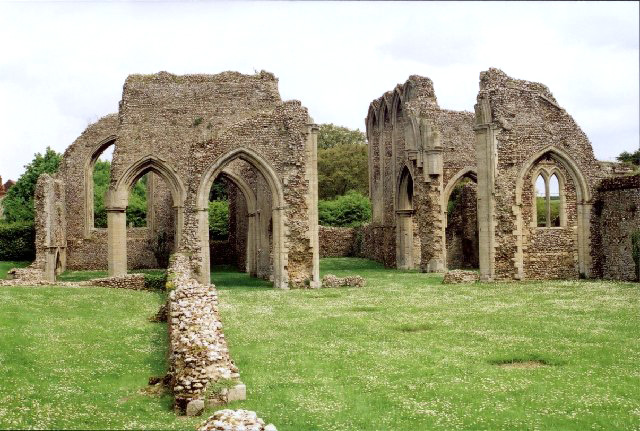
Creake Abbey was founded by the Augustinians in the 12th century

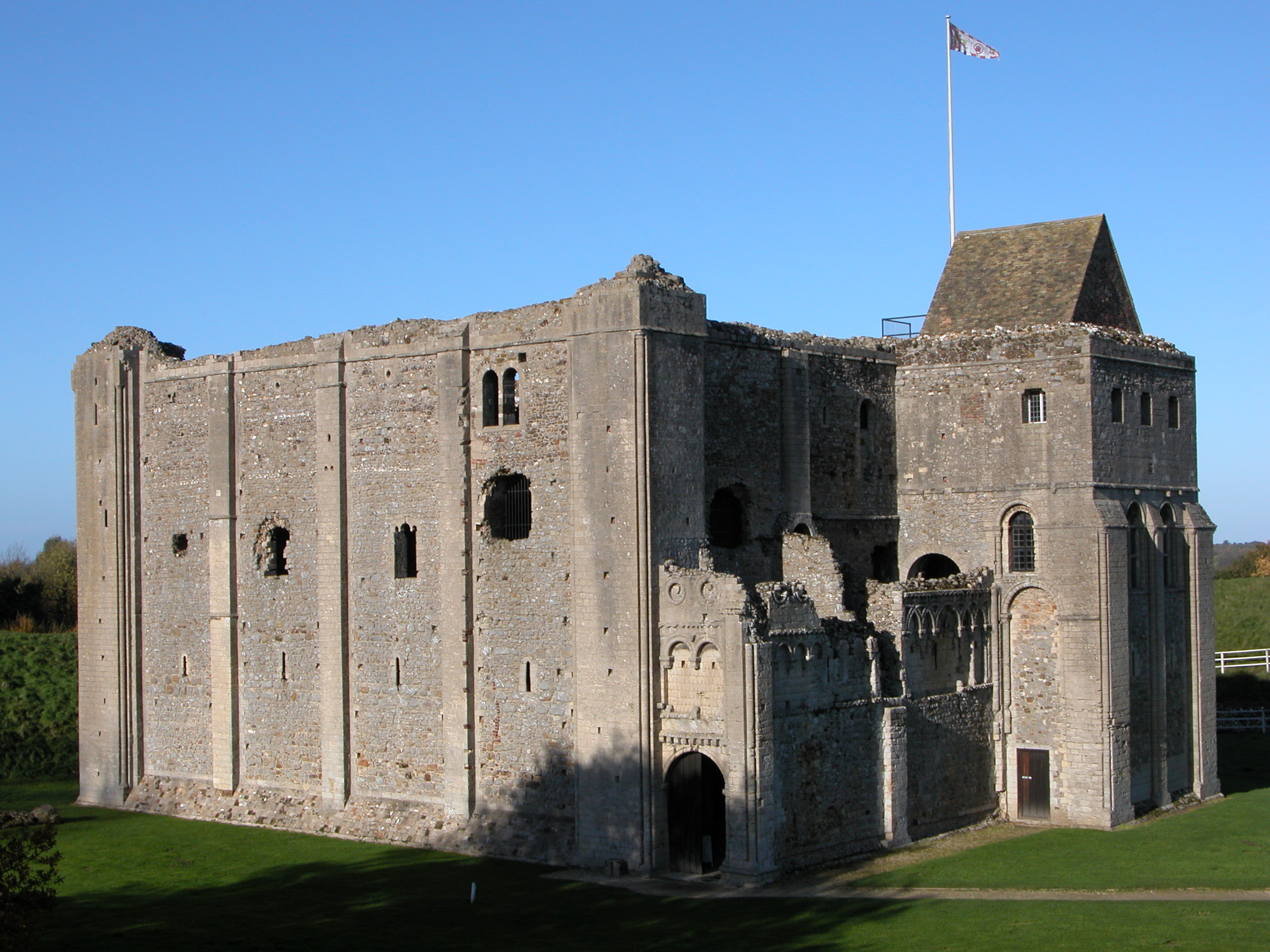
The 12th-century keep at Castle Rising

As with the rest of the country, the Church was central to mediaeval life in Norfolk. Far more mediaeval parish churches were built than in any other county in England – Norwich alone once had sixty-two churches. Over time the numbers have slowly declined, due to depopulation, competition or local reorganisation. Many new monastic communities were established during the Middle Ages. Extensive remains of several religious houses can be seen around Norfolk, such as at North Creake, Binham, Little Walsingham, Castle Acre and Thetford Priory.

Over twenty castles were built in Norfolk during the Middle Ages, the most impressive being Norwich Castle, built soon after the Norman Conquest. Many castles, such as those at Great Yarmouth and Lynn, no longer exist: most early castles were small in size and would have been timber-built. The remains of stone castles in Norfolk include those at Castle Rising, Castle Acre and Buckenham: numerous examples of earthwork remains still exist.

Castles in Norfolk (earthworks or minor ruins are indicated by italics)

The Norfolk Broads owe their existence to the large-scale extraction of peat and clay during the Middle Ages. They were once deep pits, up to 15 feet (4.6 m) in depth, from which an enormous amount of peat was dug over a period of centuries. Peat extraction may have begun during the Anglo-Saxon period, but the first evidence of the industry in Norfolk is from mediaeval abbey records. John of Oxnead is the first chronicler to record the major floods that recurred during this period, as the sea breached the vulnerable east coast and devastated the land. As a result of flooding, the extraction of peat declined and the records change from peat-digging accounts to descriptions of fen, marsh, fisheries and the importing of sea-coal from the north-east of England. Over a long period the battle to obtain peat and clay from the pits was steadily lost, as they become water-logged and then permanently flooded and all memory of the origin of the new 'broads' was lost.

In the wars between King John and his barons Roger Bigod garrisoned Norwich Castle against the king, who in 1216 on his retreat from Lynn lost his baggage in The Wash.

Norfolk returned members to parliament in 1290, and in 1298 the county and the boroughs of Kings Lynn, Norwich and Great Yarmouth returned each two members.

The story of Julian of Norwich (1342 – c. 1429) also dates to this period. She is noted as being the first woman to have written a book in English.

The Battle of North Walsham occurred on 25 or 26 June 1381. It marked the end of military resistance in Norfolk during the Peasants' Revolt. The rebels led by the 'King of the Commons' Geoffrey Litster were defeated by a force led by Henry le Despenser, Bishop of Norwich: the site is one of only five known battlefields in Norfolk.

Another legend from Norfolk dating to this period is the Pedlar of Swaffham. The legacy of this tale can be seen to this day in the choir area of the church. Here stand two wooden pews. One has the carvings of a pedlar and his dog, the other of a woman looking over the door of a shop.

== Norfolk during the Tudors and the Stuarts ==
=== Ketts Rebellion (1549) ===
Norwich at the time of Kett's Rebellion

After the enclosures of local landowners around Norfolk were destroyed, thousands of people joined Robert Kett in a march on Norwich, forming a large organised camp at Mousehold Heath in July 1549. The rebellion was largely in response to the enclosure of land, the theft of common resources, and the general abuses of power by the nobility. After a failed attempt by the authorities to disperse them on the offer of a general pardon, Norwich's city gates were shut to the rebels, who nevertheless managed to breach the defences and occupy the city. In London, the government responded to the crisis by sending the Marquess of Northampton to regain Norwich, who initially entered the city unopposed, but was forced by the rebels to withdraw with his army to Cambridge.

From this point, Kett was less successful. He failed in an attempt to spread the rebellion to Great Yarmouth. The Earl of Warwick reached Norwich and gained entry to the city with a large force. Although outnumbered, Kett's men rejected an offer of pardon and after bloody street fighting they were forced to return to Mousehold Heath. Kett made an attempt to recapture the city, but the arrival of mercenaries in support of Warwick forced him to abandon the camp. In a bloody pitched battle outside the city on 27 August 1549, the rebels were routed and Kett was captured. He was later convicted of treason and hanged from the walls of Norwich Castle.

=== Norfolk during the English Civil War ===
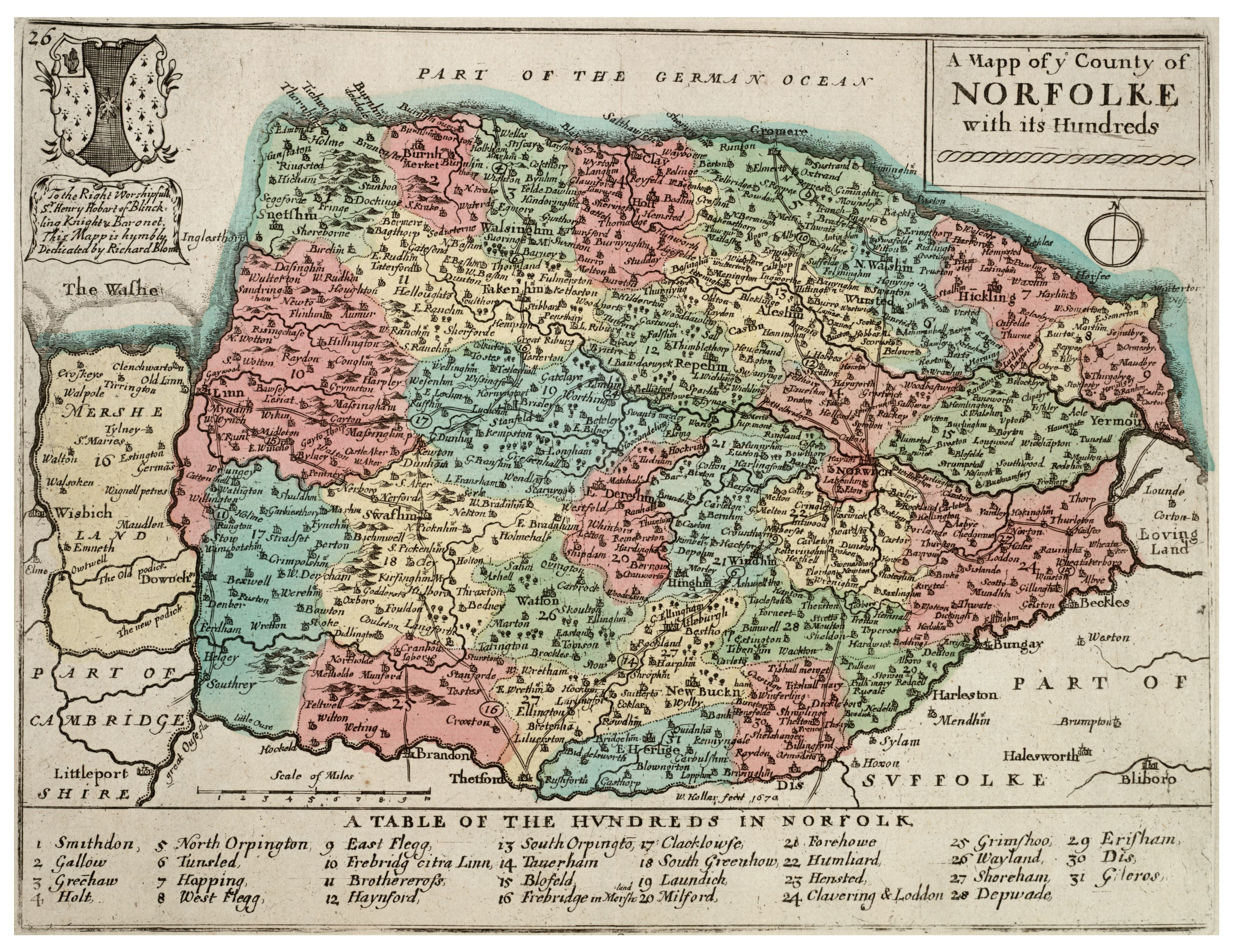
A detailed map of Norfolk during the 17th century by Wenceslas Hollar

The county supported Parliament during the English Civil War, although there was a strong element of Royalist support. The defences of Norwich and the main ports were strengthened and in December 1642 the Eastern Association was formed to place the region on a war footing, but little blood was shed in Norfolk, which was held by Parliament throughout the war. In September 1643, an anti-Papist mob caused considerable damage to Norwich Cathedral, which was occupied by troops the following year. According to Joseph Hall,

"In a kind of sacrilegious and profane procession all the organ pipes, vestments, both copes, together with the wooden cross which had been newly sawn down from over the Green Yard pulpit, and the service books and singing books that could be had, were carried to the fire in the public market place. Near the public cross all these monuments of idolatry must be sacrificed to the fire..."

The only serious fighting in Norfolk during the civil war was at King's Lynn, where Royalist sympathies were strongest. In April 1643 Parliament investigated King's Lynn and ordered the detention of the town's prominent Royalists. That August, on the assurance that Royalist forces would soon arrive, the town declared openly for the King. It was besieged by the Earl of Manchester and suffered damage from bombardment, but Parliament's attempts to raise sufficient forces was beset by difficulties and the town surrendered only after Manchester declared that on 16 September he would storm the defences. Any Royalist hopes of assisting the King in Norfolk ended.

In 1646 a series of events began that would lead to one of the Norfolk's most noteworthy disasters. Tension had been growing in the county due to rising taxation in the face of rising grain prices, coupled with increasing amounts of interference by the central government in county affairs. This led to numerous acts of resistance across the county in 1646, including rioting in Norfolk and King's Lynn. The county's largest city, Norwich, was divided between supporters of the traditional culture and Puritans. In 1647 the city's citizens elected John Utting, an act that angered local Puritans, who managed to obtain orders for him to be detained in London. Although some historians refer to Utting as a royalist, Scott E. Hendrix argues that the situation was more complicated than that. In his 2012 study of events in the county, he argues that Utting was a supporter of traditional culture rather than a supporter of the king, which included good fellowship in taverns, plays, and other traditional forms of entertainment. Furthermore, he saw no reason to ban traditional holidays, such as Christmas, a move supported by many of the city's apprentices, though it infuriated Norwich's Puritans. When a Parliamentary representative attempted to arrest Utting, the situation became literally explosive. On 24 April 1648 angry townsfolk in Norwich rioted and attacked the homes of prominent Puritans. The news of the arrival of troops to restore order incensed the people and in their search for arms they stormed the County Committee headquarters. There followed a period of great confusion, during which time rioters attached the homes of leading Puritan aldermen and that of Sheriff Thomas Ashwell. A small contingent of Parliamentary troops arrived and managed to gain entry into the city, leading to running battles along St. Stephens street. During this confused period, rioters who had taken possession of the armory contained in the Royalist Committee House on Bethel Street accidentally ignited the barrels of black powder stored there, leading to a tremendous explosion causing immense destruction to the city and great loss of life. This explosion came to be known as "The Great Blow," bringing the rioting in the city to an abrupt standstill.

== 18th-century Norfolk ==
1785 and 1786 saw the first aviation activity in the county of Norfolk, when several manned gas balloon flights were made from Quantrell's Gardens in Norwich.

== 19th-century Norfolk ==
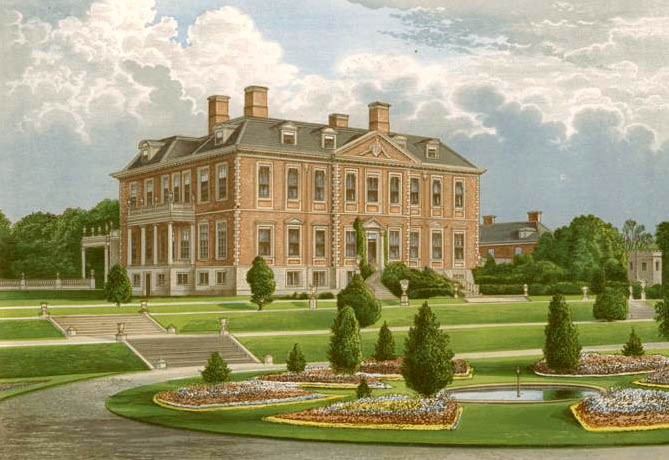
Melton Constable Hall, was once part of a large estate, owned since the 13th century by the Astley family until it was sold in 1956.

In the middle of the 19th century, over a hundred Norfolk families owned estates greater than 2,000 acres (8.1 km^{2}; 3.1 sq mi) in size, and there were numerous smaller landowners in the county. After 1875, a long depression in English agriculture and industry set in, which reduced estate incomes and put severe pressure on their owners, a situation made worse by the accumulation of debts due to family settlements or extravagant expenditure, often sustained over generations, and the introduction of Death Duties in 1894. Endebted landowners were forced to sell their possessions, let their estates for shooting, reduce staff levels or take up residence elsewhere. Estates became neglected as their owners strived to save money and many estates disappeared as farms, parks and woodland were sold off and halls were left to decay. After 1880 many larger estates changed hands, were broken up or reduced in size as land was acquired by farmers and businessmen from outside the county. A housing boom during the 1890s driven by a dramatic increase in Norfolk's population enabled some landowners on the outskirts of towns and coastal resorts to profit from the sale of their land.

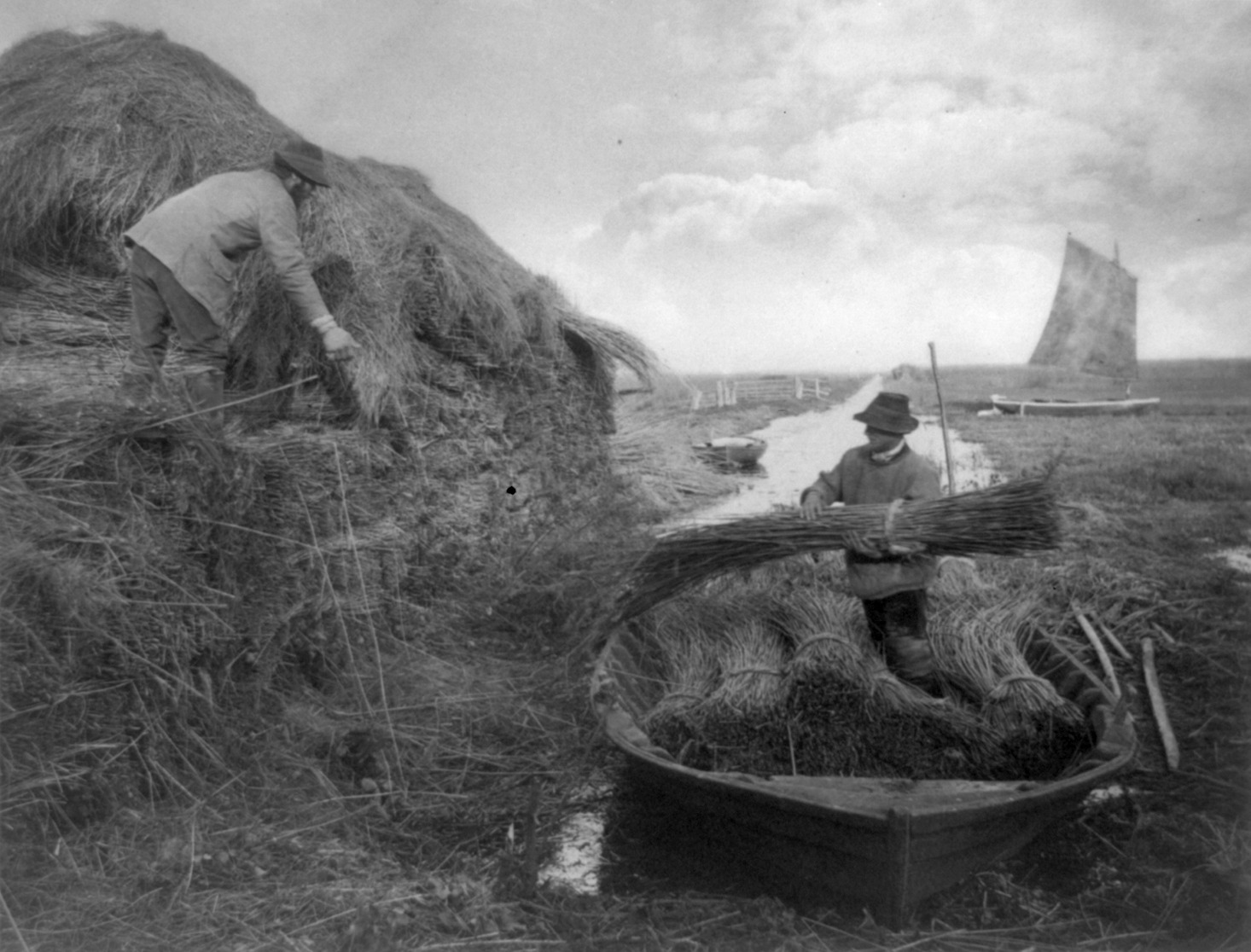
A photograph of the Norfolk Broads in the 1880s

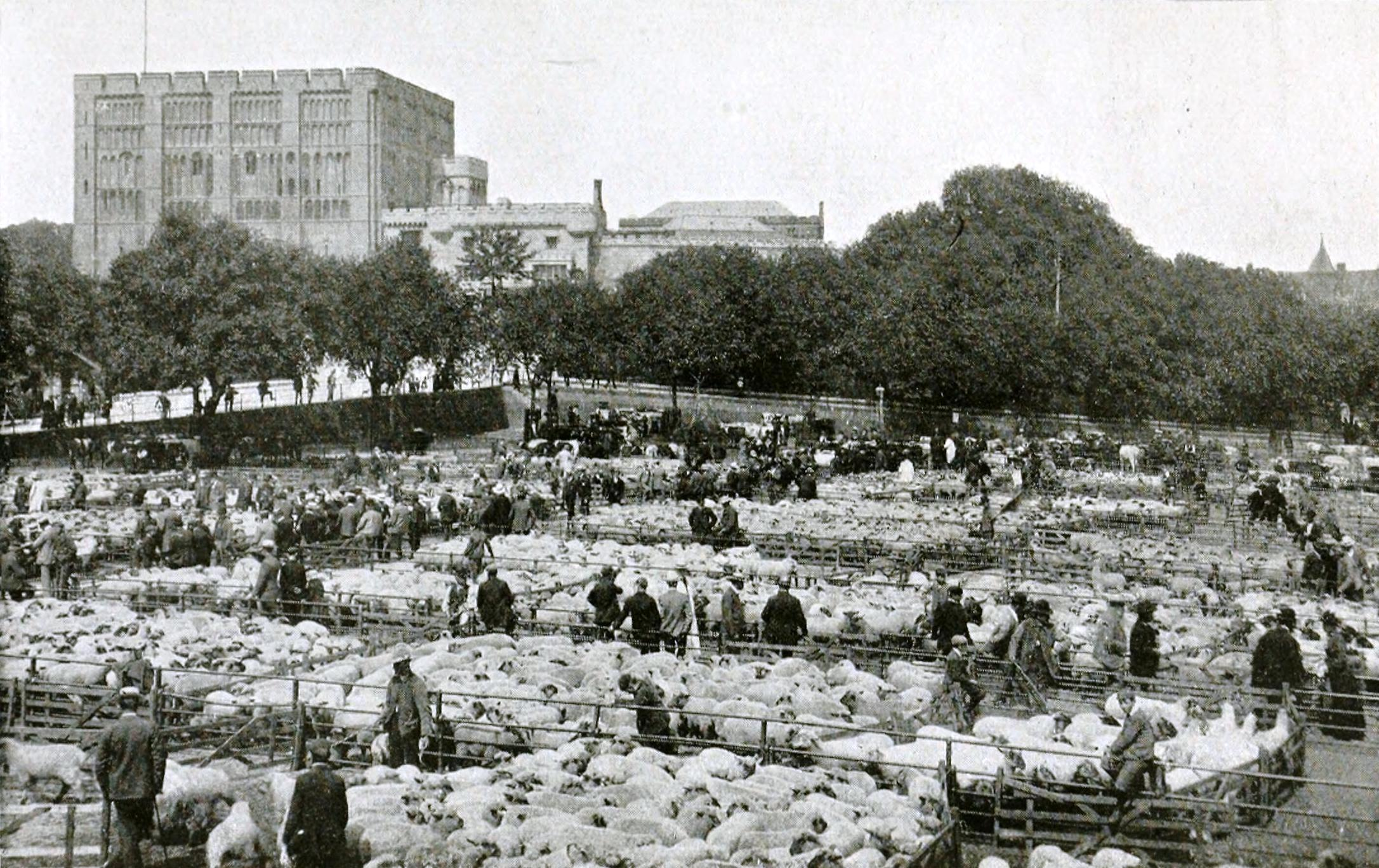
Norwich Castle and cattle market at the end of the 19th century

== 20th-century Norfolk ==
The First World War was significant to the county of Norfolk in a number of ways. Large numbers of men of fighting age were called up to join local regiments that were sent to fight in France; virtually every Norfolk village has a war memorial that records the names of those who lost their lives.

The war was the first time that significant aviation activity spread throughout the county with a large number of aerodromes and landing grounds being built. Significantly, Pulham Market in the south of the county was one of the few locations where airships were stationed. Boulton and Paul in Norwich and Savages of Kings Lynn were both involved in aircraft production, with each company producing many hundreds of aircraft for the war effort.

As well as Boulton and Paul, the firm of Lawrence Scott & Electromotors was also involved in the war effort, providing shells as well as electrical motors and other components for the Navy.

The county was one of the first places on earth bombed from the air when German Zeppelin airships raided the county a number of times. Late in the war Zeppelin L70 was shot down off the Norfolk Coast by Major Egbert Cadbury of the Royal Air Force. On board the doomed Zeppelin was Fregatenkapitan Peter Strasser, commander of the German Naval Airship Service. All on board were killed, a number of the men being buried in churchyards along the coast.

- Catch-land
- Hundreds of Norfolk
- Iceni

== Bibliography ==
- Atkin, Malcolm (1993). Norwich: History and Guide. Dover, NH: Alan Sutton Publishing Inc. ISBN 0-7509-0193-4.
- Barnes, Pam (1993). Norfolk Landowners since 1880. Norwich: Centre for East Anglian Studies. ISBN 0-906219-32-9.
- Ekwall, Eilert (1989). The Concise Oxford Dictionary of English Place-names. New York: Oxford University Press. p. 343. ISBN 0-19-869103-3.
- Hendrix, Scott E. Hendrix (2012). Riot and Resistance in County Norfolk, 1646–1650: The Road to Rebellion in Seventeenth-Century Britain. Lewiston: Edwin Mellen. ISBN 978-0-7734-3915-3.
- Malster, Robert (2003). The Norfolk and Suffolk Broads. Trowbridge: The Cromwell Press. ISBN 1-86077-243-9.
- Marten, Lucy (February 2008). "The Shiring of East Anglia: an Alternative Hypothesis". Historical Research. 81 (211): 1–27. ISSN 0950-3471.
- Oppenheimer, Stephen (2007). The Origins of the British. London: Robinson. ISBN 978-1-84119894-1.
- Williamson, Tom (2006). England's Landscape – East Anglia. English Heritage. ISBN 0-00-715571-9.
