= Cnobheresburg =

Historic place in East Anglia

Cnobheresburg was a castrum in East Anglia, where in about 630 the first Irish monastery in southern England was founded by Saint Fursey, as part of the Hiberno-Scottish mission described by Bede.

The Venerable Bede mentions Cnobheresburg in Chapter 19, Book 3 of his Ecclesiastical History of the English People, where he relates that Saint Ultan joined the mission led by Saint Fursey which went from Ireland through British territory to East Anglia around 633 AD, to the kingdom of King Sigeberht of East Anglia. Bede describes the monastery at Cnobheresburg as follows: "This monastery was pleasantly situated in some woods close to the sea, within the area of a fortification that the English call Cnobheresburg, meaning Cnobhere's Town. Subsequently Anna, king of the province, and his nobles endowed the house with finer buildings and gifts."

Following the attack on the monastery in 651 by Penda of Mercia, Anna of East Anglia was forced by Penda to flee into exile.

The location is uncertain. The site is commonly identified with the Saxon Shore fort of Burgh Castle (Norfolk) near the mouth of the river Yare, thought to be the Gariannonum of the Notitia Dignitatum and of the geographical description of Britain by Ptolemy.

Historians find many arguments against this location, but are unable to agree on a better one. The Roman fort at Burgh Castle was excavated by Charles Green during 1958–61. A detailed report by Norfolk Museums Service in 1983 (East Anglian Archaeology 20) found no evidence of any monastic settlement in Burgh Castle itself.
