= Burgh Castle =

Village in Norfolk, England

Coordinates: 52.585°N 1.653°E

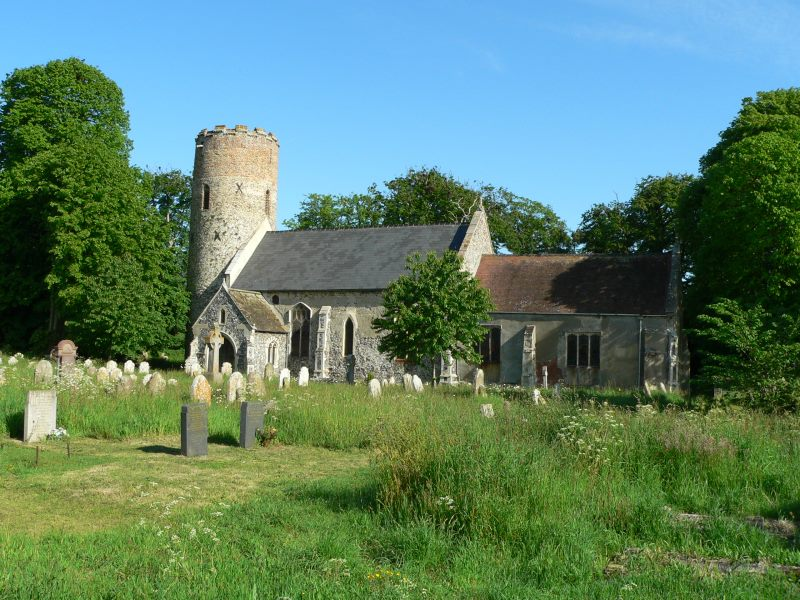
- Church of St. Peter and St. Paul

- Location within Norfolk
- Area: 6.01 km^{2} (2.32 sq mi)
- Population: 1,323 (2021)
  - Density: 220/km^{2} (570/sq mi)
- OS grid reference: TG476049
- Civil parish: Burgh Castle
- District: Great Yarmouth
- Shire county: Norfolk
- Region: East
- Country: England
- Sovereign state: United Kingdom
- Post town: GREAT YARMOUTH
- Postcode district: NR31
- Dialling code: 01493
- UK Parliament: Great Yarmouth

Burgh Castle is a village and civil parish in the English county of Norfolk. It is 3 miles (4.8 km) south-west of Great Yarmouth and 16 miles (26 km) east of Norwich. It is most notable for the Roman Saxon Shore fort also called Burgh Castle.

Parts of the parish is in the area of the Norfolk Broads, and the western and northern boundaries are marked by the River Waveney, River Yare, and by the western part of Breydon Water. At the 2021 census it had a population of 1,323, an increase from 1,150 at the 2011 census. The parish was part of Suffolk until 1974.

== Roman fort ==
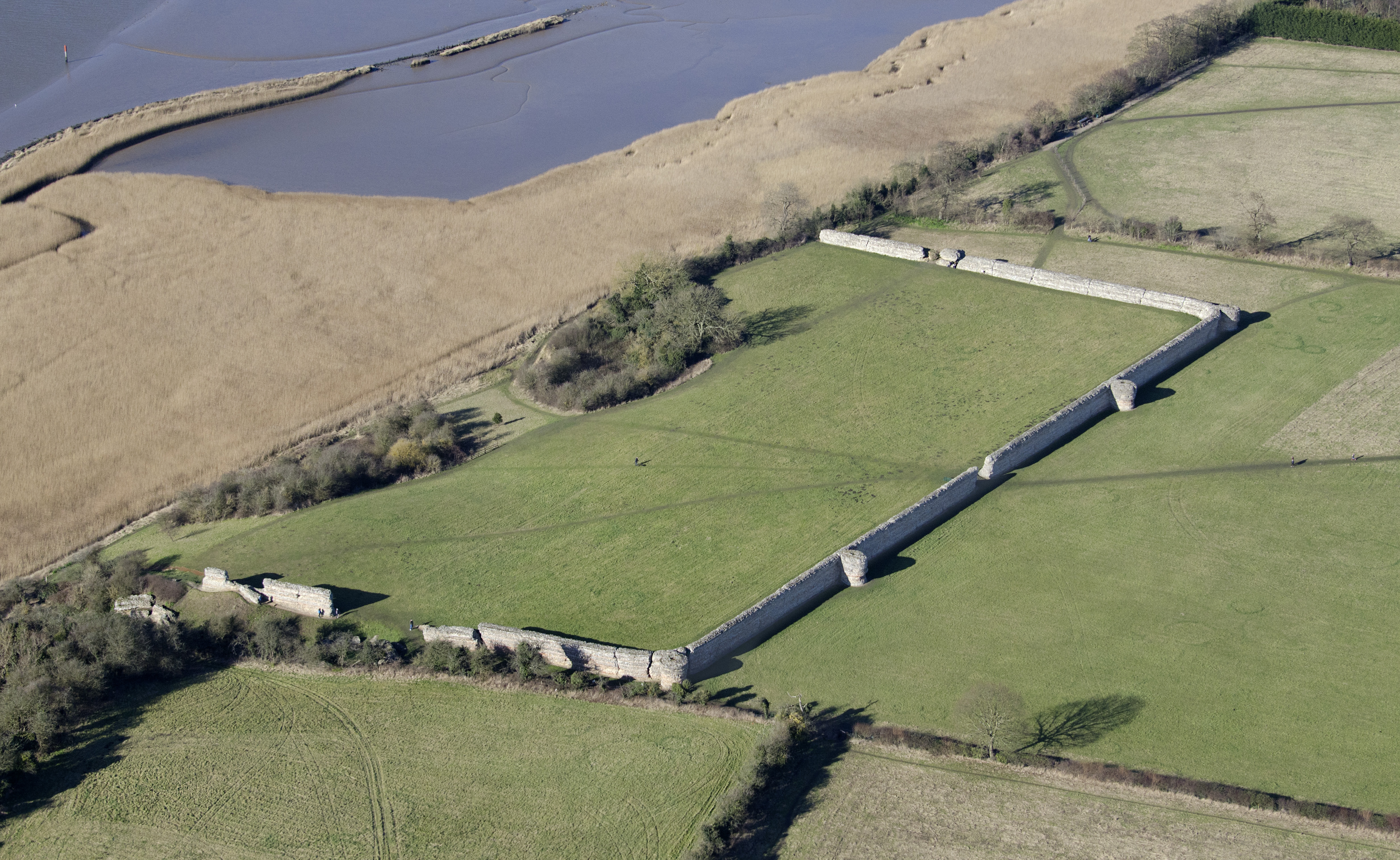
The Roman fort remains from above

There is evidence of Neolithic activity in the area, with a number of flint and bronze axe-heads discovered, but the Roman fortification of Burgh Castle is the earliest settlement known within the parish. The fort, which is a possible site for Gariannonum, dates to the third century and was part of the Saxon Shore fortifications designed to protect Roman Britain from invaders. It stands at the top of a slope overlooking the modern River Waveney to the west, but when it was built the fort would have been on the coast, guarding the mouth of a wide estuary.

The surviving north, south, and east walls stand to a height of up to 4.6 metres (15 ft) with a width of 3 metres (9.8 ft) at the base. The internal dimensions of the fort measure 205 metres (673 ft) by 100 metres (330 ft) and six remaining bastions are visible. A probable Roman vicus and field systems are outside the walls. Material from the walls of the fort has been used in the parish church.

There is evidence of Anglo-Saxon and Norman use of the fort. Excavations by Charles Green in the mid-20th century discovered a timber church in the south-west of the fort, with a Christian cemetery attached, and the site is considered a possible location of a Saxon monastery founded by St Fursey in the early 630s. This is recorded with the name Cnobheresburg by Bede, although there is no firm evidence that the site was at Burgh Castle. A motte-and-bailey castle was built at the fort after the Norman Conquest; the remains had been destroyed by the mid-19th century.

The site is a scheduled monument, with the walls designated as a Grade I listed building. The site has been owned by the Norfolk Archaeological Trust since 1996, with the walls in the care of English heritage. It is open free of charge to visitors.

== Later history ==
Saxon era field systems have been discovered at Burgh Castle and parts of the parish church date to the late-Saxon or early-Norman period. Prior to the Norman Conquest, the manor was held by Stigand, the Archbishop of Canterbury. In the Domesday Book of 1086 it is recorded as a settlement of 15 households in the hundred of Lothingland with a church, five plough teams, and three salthouses. It formed part of the estates of Ralph the Bowman who may have been responsible for the construction of the motte-and-bailey castle within the Roman fort. Salt was harvested from a number of salt pans, and this is likely to have remained an important industry within the village into the medieval period along with the harvesting of reeds and osiers. Mills were later used to drain marshland, allowing the use of the land next to the rivers for agriculture.

A medieval manor house is known to have been built, but the site is unknown. St Peter’s Guildhall was rebuilt in 1548 after a fire; the building was demolished in the 19th century. During the 19th century at least three brick-making works developed in the parish.

== Amenities ==
Burgh Castle remains a small village. A number of holiday parks have developed in the south of the parish, and there are two public houses in the parish as well as other facilities in the holiday parks. A boatyard and marina occupy the site of the former Burgh Castle Brickworks on the River Waveney.

== St Peter and St Paul's Church ==
Burgh Castle's parish church is dedicated to Saint Peter and Saint Paul and is one of Norfolk's 124 remaining round-tower churches. The building is Grade II* listed and incorporates significant amounts of Roman material, almost certainly from the nearby Roman fort. Parts of the tower and possibly parts of the nave date from the late-11th century, with the bulk of the building being 13th century. It was remodelled in the 15th century with additions in the 18th and 19th centuries. The octagonal baptismal font is medieval in date and a stained glass window in the church depicts St Fursey.
