= Catch-land =

The term catch-land was used for such land, particularly in Norfolk, England, which was not certainly known to what parish it belongs; so that the parson who first got the tithes there, enjoyed it for that year.
