= Burgh Castle (Roman fortification) =

Roman archaeological site

Burgh Castle Roman Site
- Norfolk, England
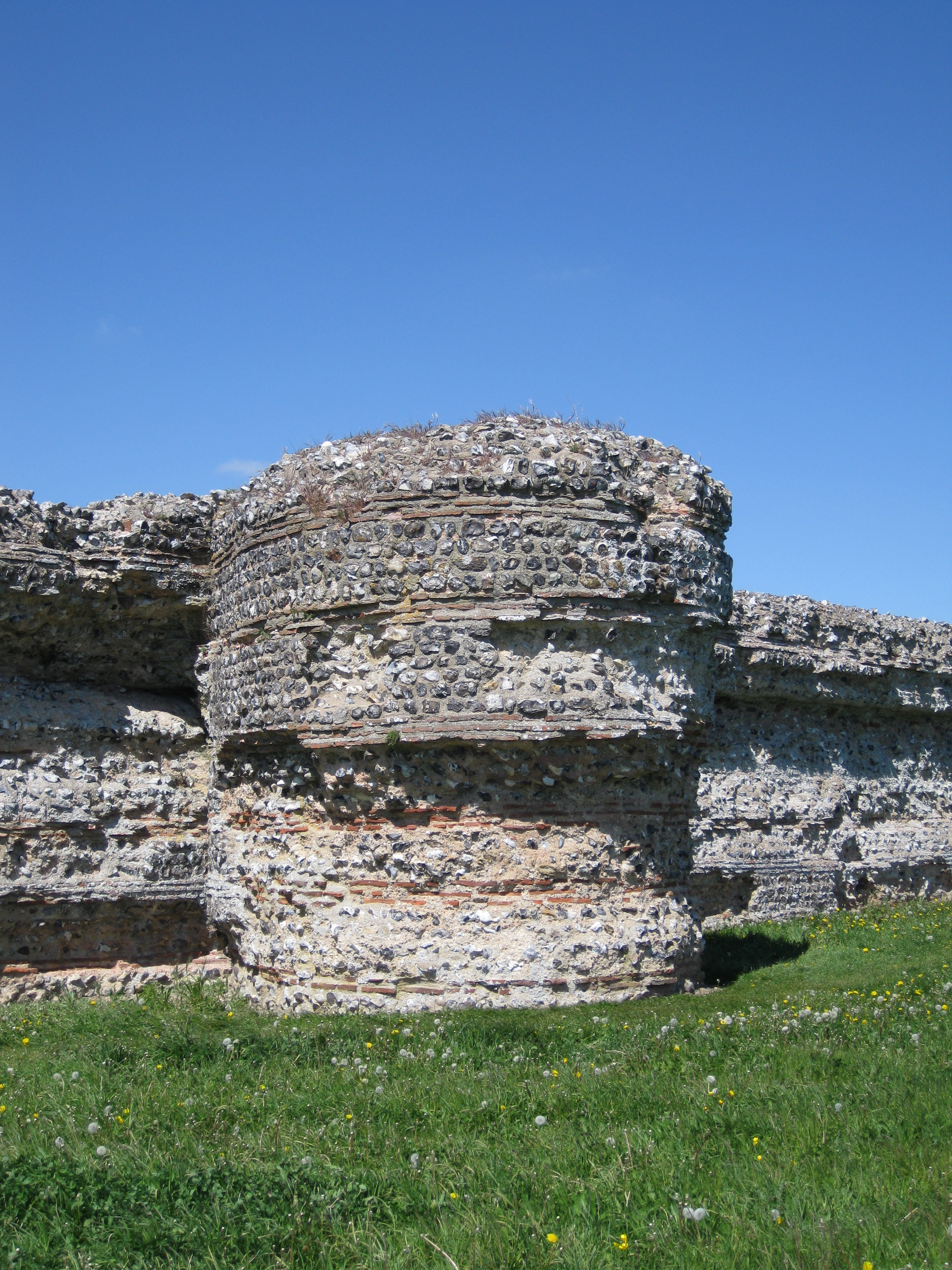
- A bastion on the eastern wall

Site information
- Type: Rectangular Roman Shore fort later Norman motte and bailey fort
- Owner: Norfolk Archaeological Trust and English Heritage
- Open to the public: Yes
- Condition: Roman fort: fair, surviving walls on 3 sides to 4.6 m (15 ft) high Norman fort: no remains

Location
- Shown within Norfolk
- Location within Norfolk
- Coordinates: 52°34′57″N 1°39′05″E
- Grid reference: grid reference TG474045

Site history
- Materials: Flint and some brick/tile

Burgh Castle is the site of one of nine Roman Saxon Shore forts constructed in England around the 3rd century AD, to hold troops as a defence against Saxon raids up the rivers of the east and south coasts of southern Britain. It is located on the summit of ground sloping steeply towards the estuary of the River Waveney, in the civil parish of Burgh Castle, in the county of Norfolk (but until 1974 in Suffolk).

This fort was possibly known as Gariannonum, although the single record that uses the name may perhaps be referring to the Roman site at Caister-on-Sea. Between the mid-7th and 9th centuries the site was possibly occupied by a monastic settlement, and in the 11th and 12th centuries a Norman motte and bailey castle existed there.

== Etymology ==
In Roman times Burgh Castle was apparently known as Gariannonum or Gariannum, a name that appears in a single source, the Notitia Dignitatum, a Roman Army "order of battle" from about 400 AD. The identification was once thought secure, but is now thought debatable by some specialists.

Burgh is derived from the same Old English language word burh (whose dative singular and nominative/accusative plural form byrig sometimes underlies modern place-names, and which had dialectal variants including burg; it was also sometimes confused with beorh, beorg, 'mound, hill'. The Old English word was originally used for a fortified town or proto-castle, as in Burgh Castle, and was related to the verb beorgan (cf. Dutch and German bergen), meaning "to keep, save, make secure". In German Burg means castle or fortress, though so many towns grew up around castles that it almost came to mean city, and is incorporated into many placenames, such as Hamburg, Flensburg and Strasbourg.

== Description ==
=== Roman fort ===
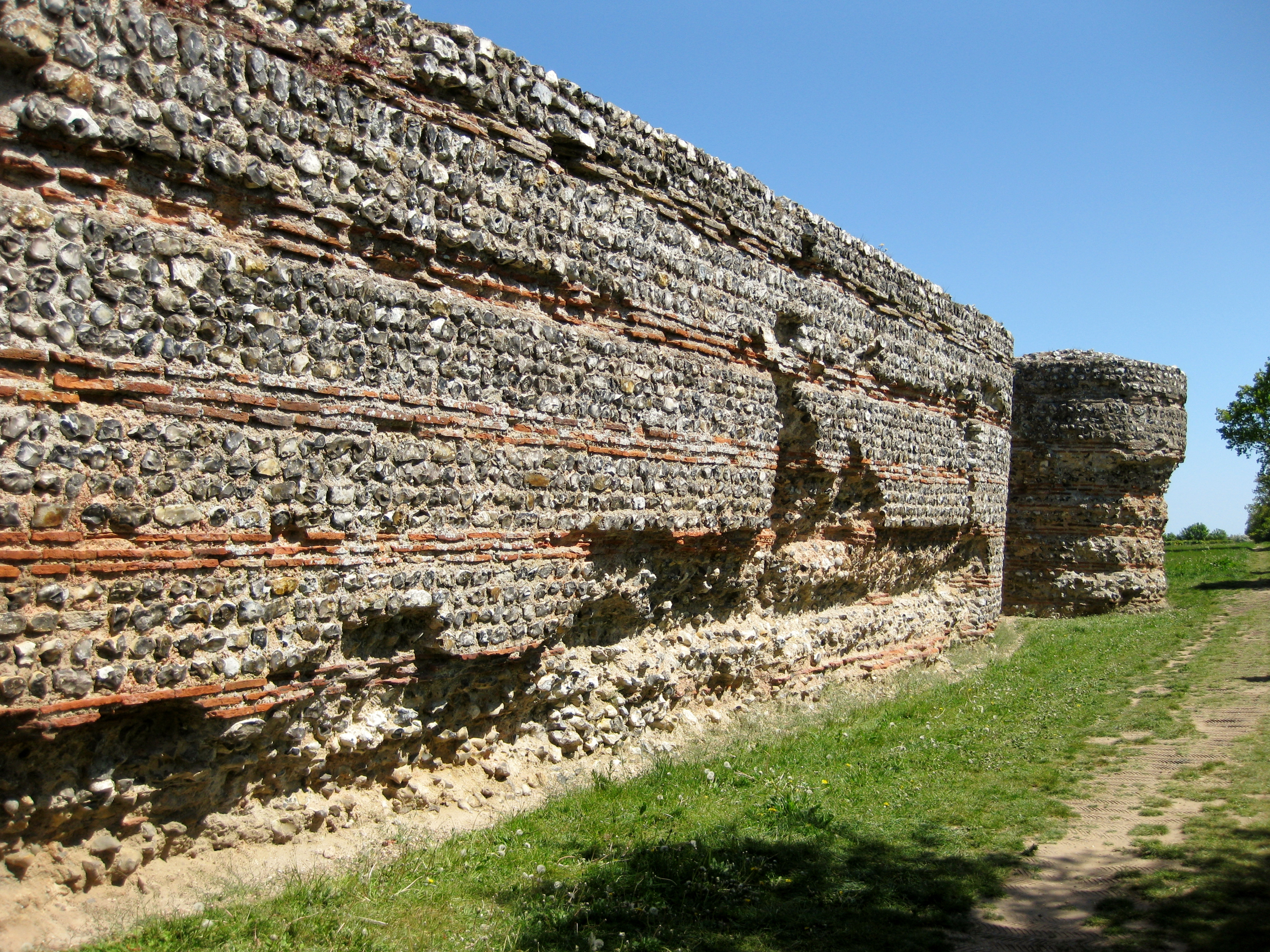
The well-preserved southern walls, with bastion

The fort is roughly rectangular, measuring (internally) approximately 205 m (673 ft) by 100 m (330 ft). The walls on the north, east, and much of the south side are largely intact, standing at a height of approximately 4.6 m (15 ft) and measuring up to 3 m (9.8 ft) thick at the base. They have a core of mortared flint rubble and an external and internal facing of prepared flint and red tile or brick in alternating bands. Against the outer face of the walls there are six solid bastions of pear-shaped plan spaced symmetrically, two on the south wall, one each at the north-east and south-east angles, one slipped from position on the north wall, and one below the south wall where it has fallen. The west wall has at some time in the distant past collapsed down the underlying hillside and into what was once an estuary but is now a marsh, and nothing of it is now visible. Breydon Water is all that is left of the estuary this fort once overlooked.

Coin and pottery evidence on the site indicates that the occupation of the fort dates from the mid-3rd century AD, with Roman occupation continuing up to the early 5th century AD when the integration of Roman and Saxon traditions appear.

=== Monastic settlement ===
Burgh Castle has been suggested as the site of Cnobheresburg, the unknown place (a castrum or fort) in East Anglia, where in about 630 the first Irish monastery in southern England was founded by Saint Fursey, as part of the Hiberno-Scottish mission described by Bede. Historians find many arguments against this location, but are unable to agree on a better one.

The fort site was excavated by the archaeologist Charles Green between 1958 and 1961, and apparently revealed the remains of a timber monastic church, in the southwest corner of the fort, with a Christian cemetery just to the north of it, which contained some 144 interments as well as pits containing re-interred bones. A cluster of oval huts towards the north-east angle of the fort may be interpreted as cells or workshops. Coins and Ipswich ware carry the occupation well into the 8th and possibly 9th century. However a detailed report by Stephen Johnson of Norfolk Museums Service in 1983 (East Anglian Archaeology 20) concluded that there was no definitive evidence for any monastic settlement in Burgh Castle itself.

=== Norman castle ===
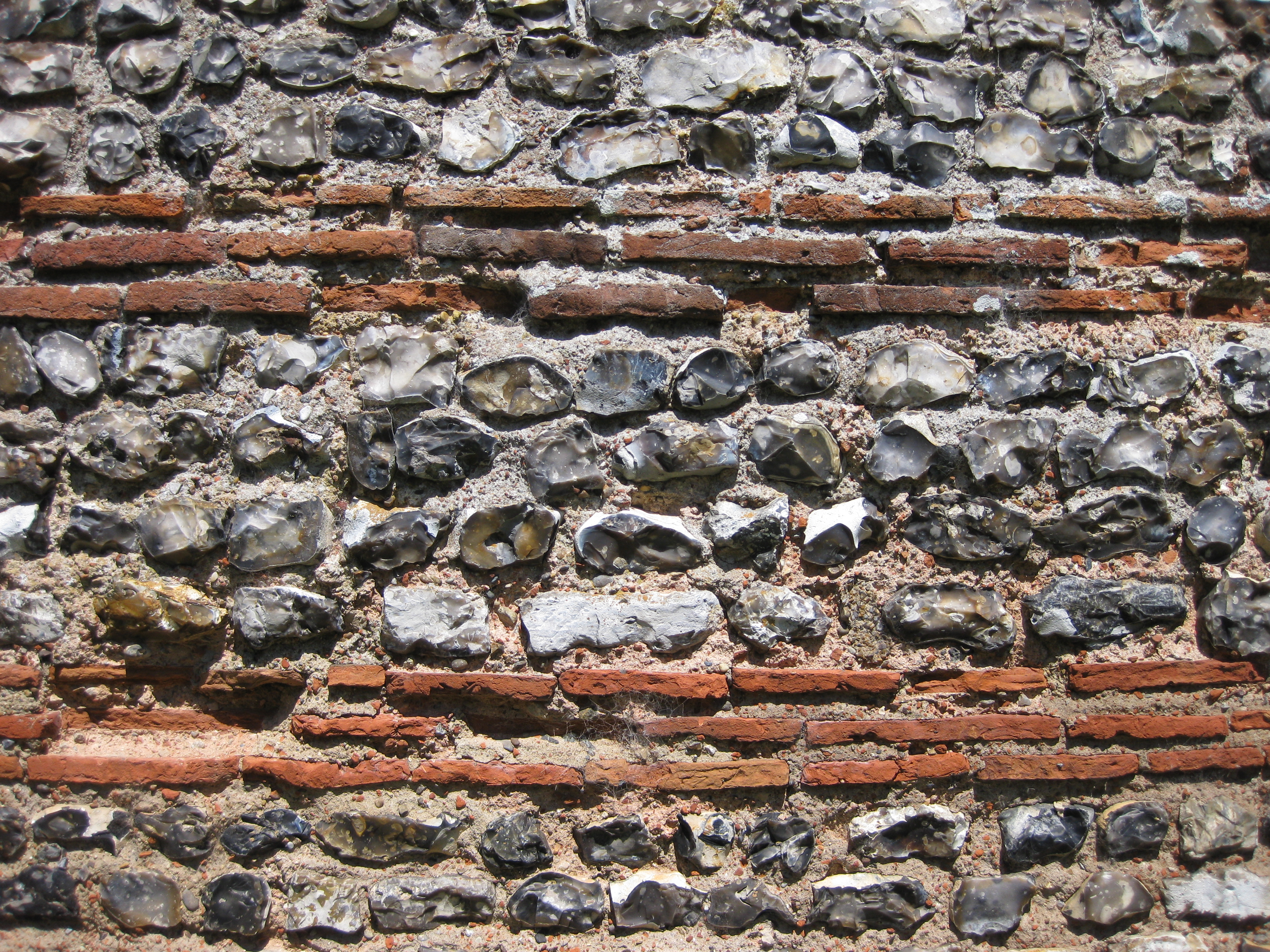
Close-up of the flint and brick-tile construction of the perimeter wall

In the 11th and 12th centuries a motte was constructed in the south-west corner, using the Roman fort as a bailey. The motte was partly removed in around 1770, in 1839 it was completely levelled. The ditch was in-filled in the same year. Archaeological excavations identified a timber tower on the motte, with the bailey, of the castle located to the northeast of the motte.

=== Re-use of materials ===
The fort lies close to Burgh Castle's medieval church of St Peter and St Paul, which incorporates Roman brick in its fabric, presumably taken from the fort site.

In the 17th century, Sir Henry Spelman recorded a tradition that the fort had been occupied by Jews, and reported the name of a track leading away from it as "Jews' Way". (A surviving fragment of the route, in the adjacent parish of Bradwell, is still named "Jews Lane".) This is likely to reflect a popular sense of the site having been the home of an ancient but enigmatic people, and perhaps its use as a quarry for building materials.

== Location ==
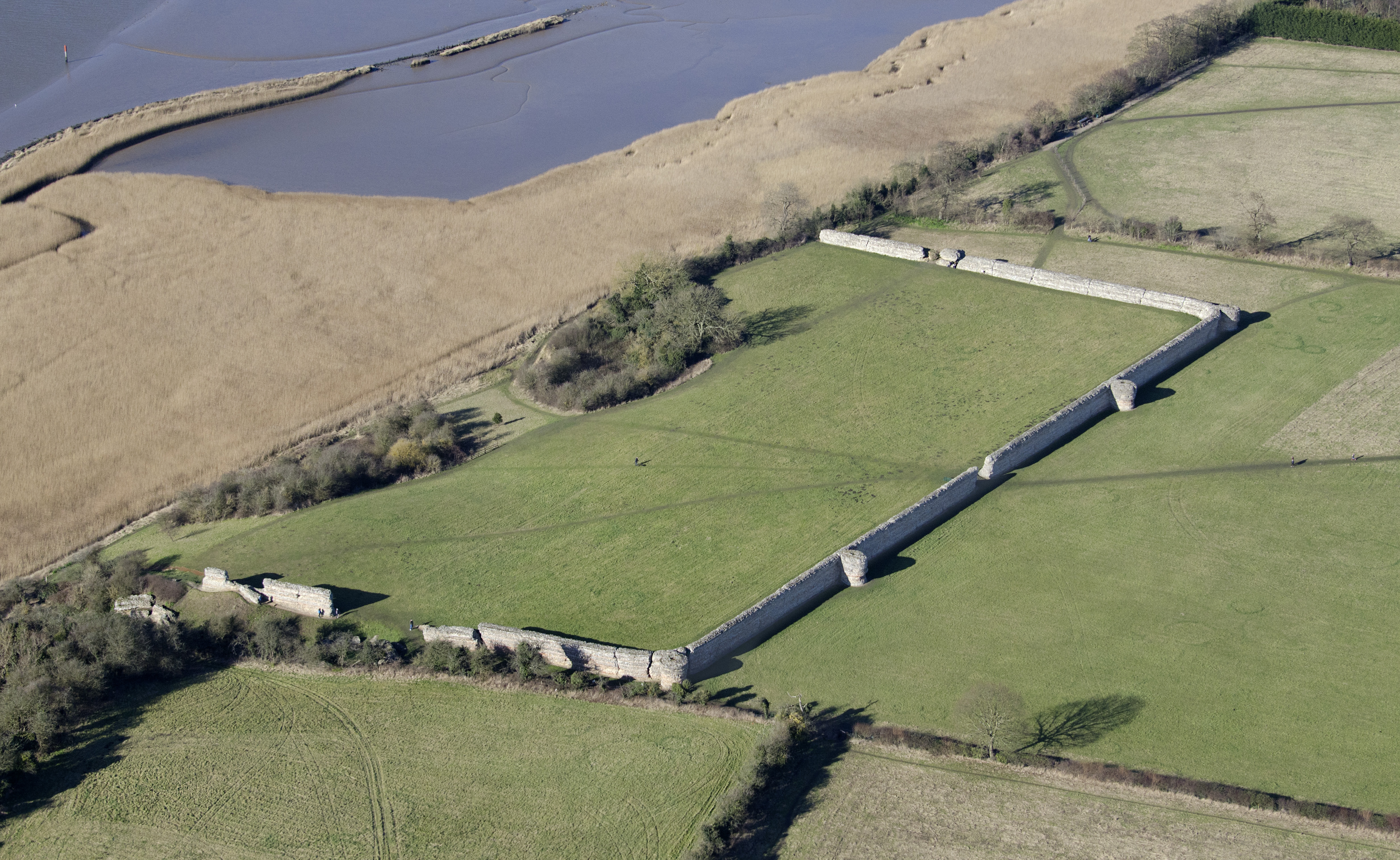
The Roman site from above. The seaward wall at left has been washed away.

The site is located to the west of the village and civil parish of Burgh Castle, in the county of Norfolk. It is located on the eastern bank of the southernmost part of Breydon Water, formed at the mouths of the rivers Bure, Yare, and Waveney. Today however it is separated from the estuary by mudflats. The Roman fort site of Caister-on-Sea lies a few miles to the northeast.

The site is owned by the Norfolk Archaeological Trust, with the walls in the care of English Heritage. The site can be visited without charge and is accessible to disabled visitors.

== Fiction ==
Burgh Castle is the Roman fort featured in the short story "Interloper's Folly" by S. A. Carr. It is one of the settings in the mystery A Pretty Deceit by Anna Lee Huber, published in October 2020. It appears in the video game Assassin's Creed Valhalla during an assault and storm against Rued.

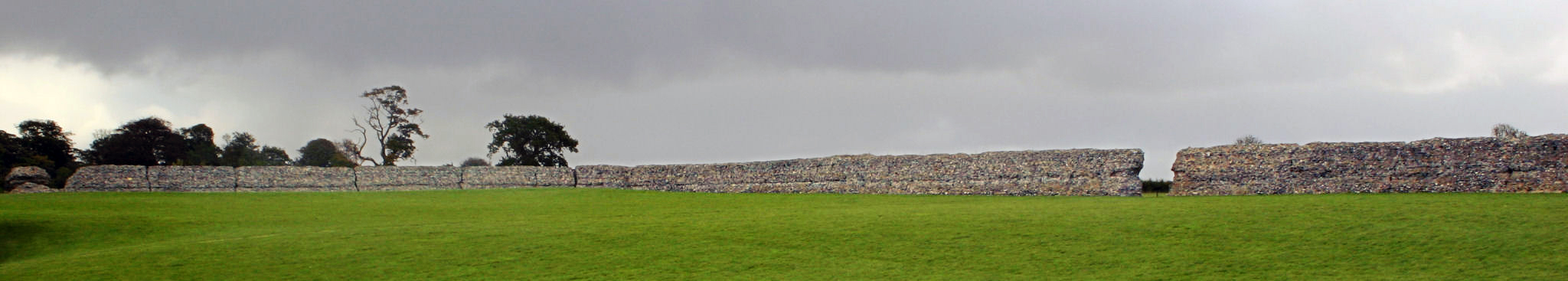
Moveable panorama of Burgh Castle's Roman walls

== See also ==
- Branodunum
- List of Latin place names in Britain
- List of Roman place names in Britain
- Roman Britain
- Roman sites in the United Kingdom
- Sub-Roman Britain
