= Caister Roman Site =

Roman Saxon Shore fort in Norfolk, England

- Norfolk, England
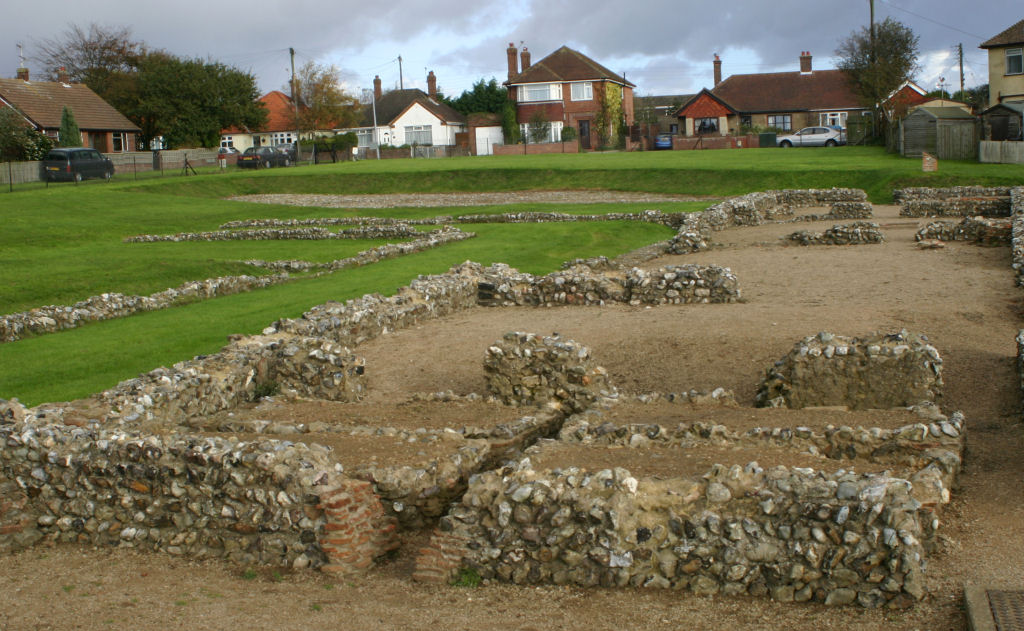
- Caister Roman Site

Site information
- Type: Roman Shore Fort
- Owner: English Heritage
- Open to the public: Yes
- Condition: partially excavated remains

Location
- Shown within Norfolk
- Coordinates: 52.6500°N 1.7193°E
- Grid reference: grid reference TG517122

Site history
- Materials: Flint and some brick/tile

Caister Roman Site is a Roman Saxon Shore fort, located in Caister-on-Sea, Norfolk, England. It was constructed around AD 200 for use by units of the Roman army and navy, and was occupied until around 370-390 AD. This fort was possibly known as Gariannonum, although the single record that describes it as such may also mean the Roman site at Burgh Castle.

== Description ==
The fort was originally 3.5 ha (8.6 acres) in size and roughly square in shape, with large stone perimeter walls 4 to 5 m (13 to 16 ft) high, earth ramparts and ditches of 175 m (574 ft) in length on all four sides. There were defensive towers at the corners and fortified gate houses in the middle of each side

At the time of its construction, the site of the fort would have been on the north side of an estuary, with a pebbled street from the fort's south gate leading a short distance to a harbour or docks. In around AD 260 a fort at Burgh Castle was constructed on the opposite side of the estuary, with both forts probably serving to protect Roman shipping in the estuary.

Between 1951 and 1955, a section of the fort was excavated with the main structures left exposed, including part of the south gate, the western section of the south wall perimeter defences, building foundations, and main road. The remainder of the site, approximately 3.15 ha (7.8 acres) now lies under modern housing.

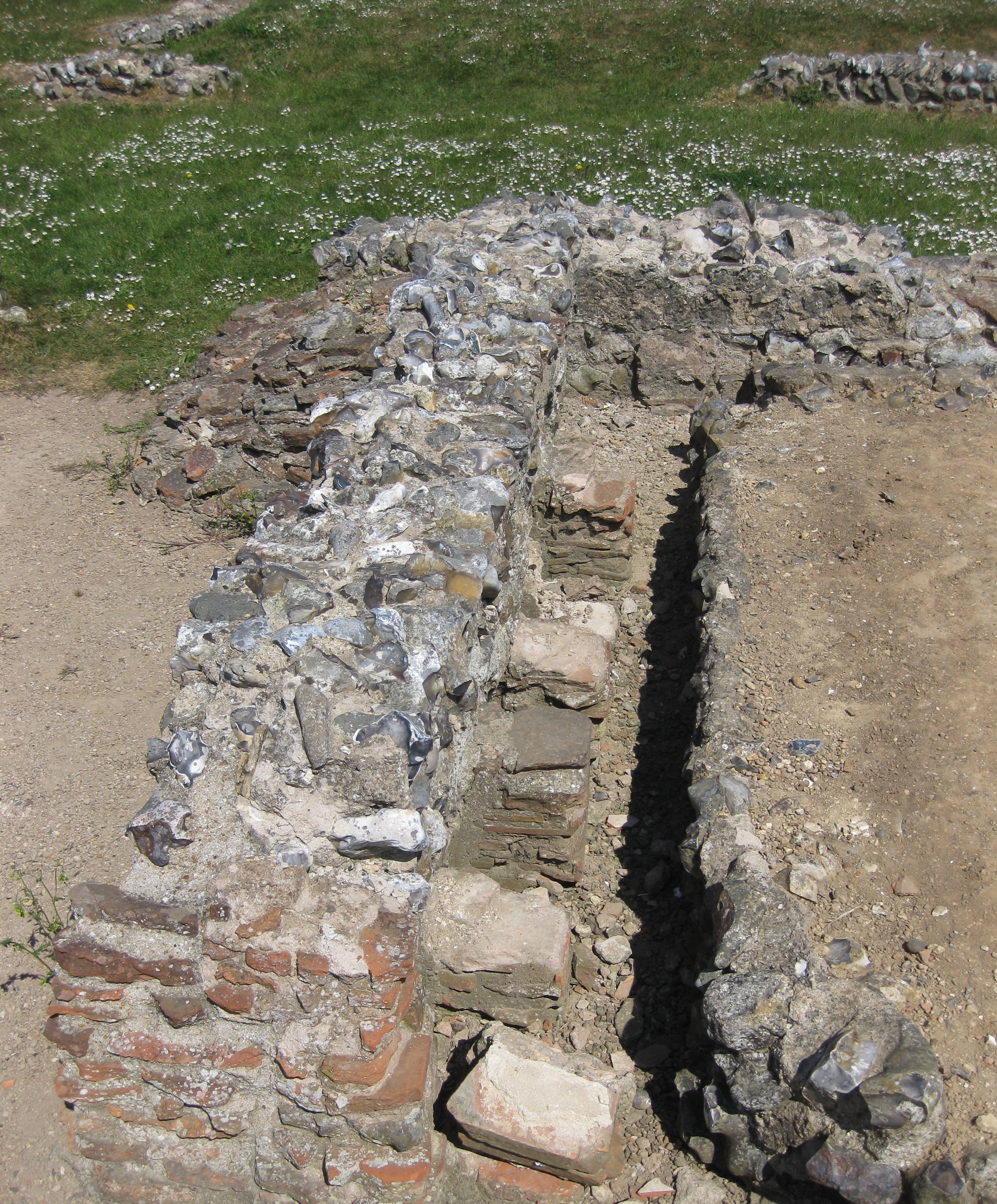
Detail of the hypocaust at the site.

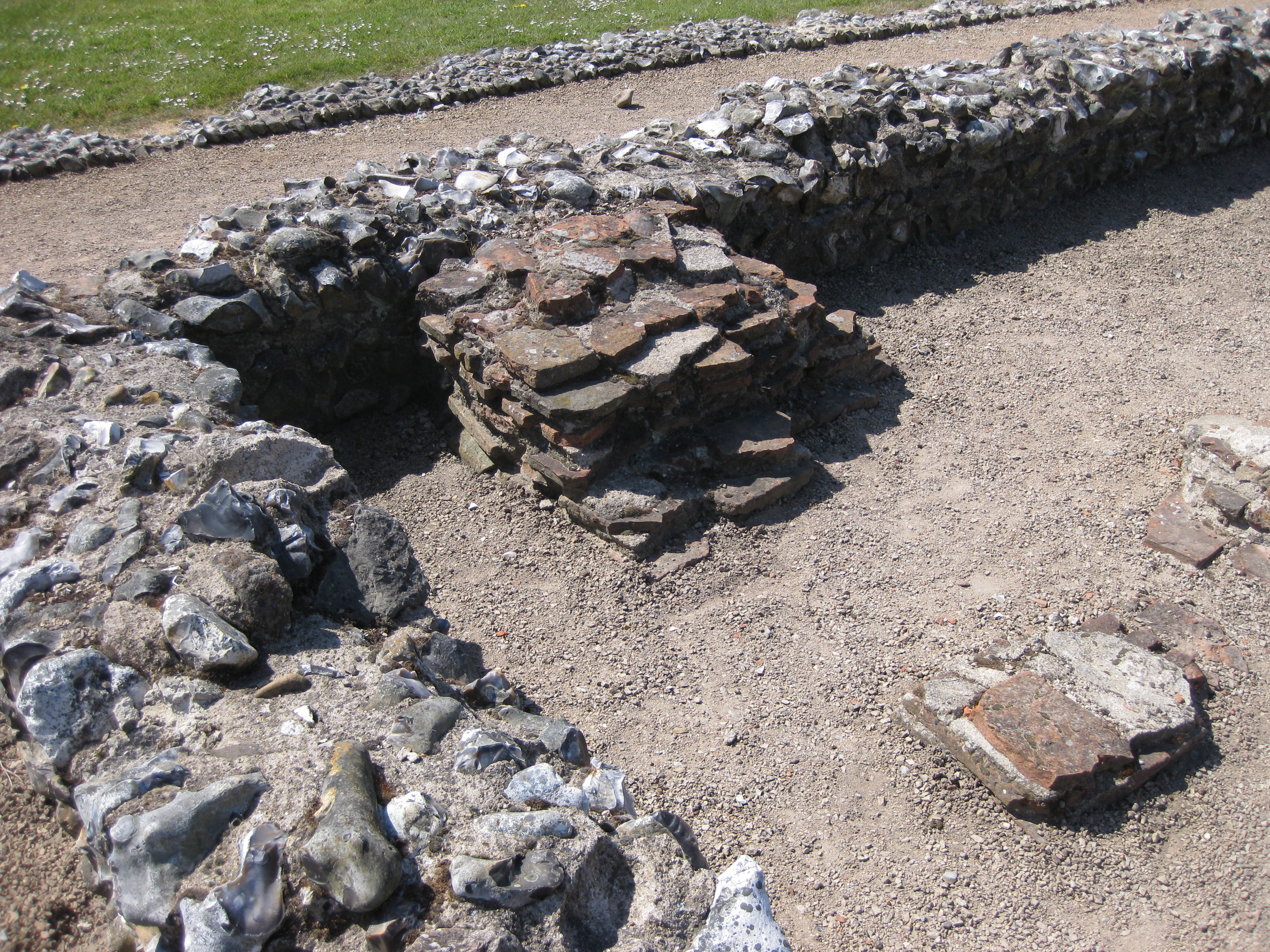
A detail of part of the remaining building structure at Caister

Inside the current visitor entrance is a large defensive ditch, the innermost of a series of ditches around the fort, part of the south gate, and to the left of the gate the remains of a small rectangular guard chamber.

Just to the north of the south wall, and on a roughly east–west alignment are the remains of a building of approximately 45 m (148 ft) in length with at least six rooms of unequal size, and a further wing of the building extends northwards at the western end. On the southern side is a parallel wall which could be part of a portico, and perhaps would have served also to retain the inner face of the earthen bank behind the south wall of the fort. The second room from the west contains an example of a hypocaust heated floor. On the north side of the building is a corridor running along the southern and south eastern sides of a rectangular courtyard beyond. It is likely that the building was in use during the later third and fourth centuries AD and likely to have served various domestic and industrial functions at different times. There is evidence that the building was severely damaged by fire in the later fourth century. Within the courtyard area are parts of other possibly earlier buildings, which include for various structures and the remains of a corn-drying kiln and a water tank.

During the original archaeological digs, this building had been incorrectly interpreted as either a hotel or seamen's hostel, and it was also assumed that the building north of here was a brothel, however since then both buildings have been reinterpreted as forming part of the original fort.

Following the Roman occupation, the site remained unoccupied until the Middle and Late Anglo-Saxon periods (between 650-850 and 850-1066 AD), until a settlement was established near the centre of the fort. To the south of the fort a large Anglo-Saxon cemetery has been excavated.

Today (2012) the remains of the fort are open free of charge to the public by English Heritage.

== Finds ==
Finds during the archaeological excavation include four Roman coins of the mid 4th century, as well as seven small hoards, the remains of wattle and daub walling, pottery, glass, part of a pewter plate, and grain.

== Location ==
The site is located on the western edge of the town of Caister-on-Sea, in the county of Norfolk. At the time of its construction, the site of the fort would have been on the north side of an estuary, at the mouths of the Rivers Ant, Bure, Yare, and Waveney. Today however, the northward extension of the Yarmouth sandbank has meant that this shore fort now lies some distance inland. The Roman Saxon Shore fort of Burgh Castle lies a few miles to the southwest; its ruins are much more extensive than those at Caister. Burgh Castle is also now in Norfolk, having been in Suffolk until 1974.

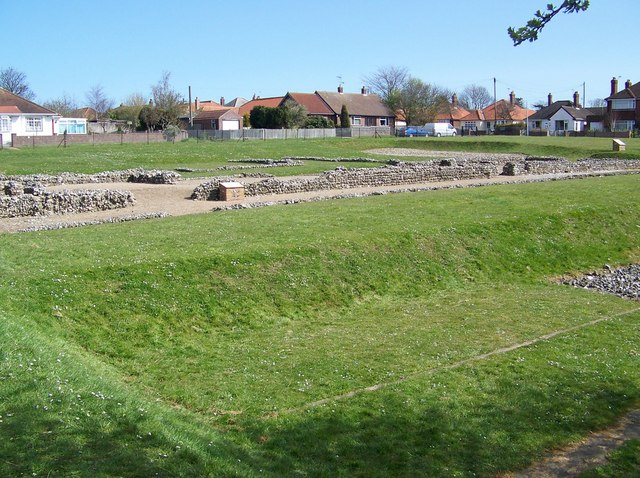
A view of Caister Roman Site from the south-west corner of the outer ditch, and looking northeast

== See also ==
- Roman sites in Great Britain
- List of Roman place names in Britain
- List of Latin place names in Britain
- Roman Britain
- Sub-Roman Britain
