= Branodunum =

Ancient Roman fort in Norfolk, England

- Norfolk, England, UK
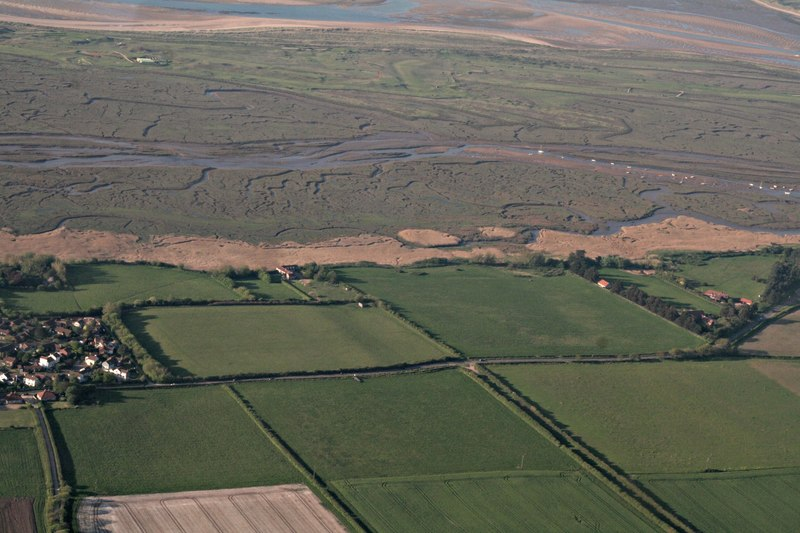
- Aerial view of Branodunum

Location
- Location in Norfolk
- Coordinates: 52.9639°N 0.6519°E
- Grid reference: TF7844

Branodunum was an ancient Roman fort to the east of the modern English village of Brancaster in Norfolk.

== Name ==
Branodunum is the Latinization of *Branodunon, a Celtic compound based on brano- "raven" and dunon "closed area, fortified enclosure, citadel, fort", then "hill, mount", hence the Welsh Din (in toponyms), and dinas "town", as well as the old Breton din "fortress" and din cat "combat fortress". Bran is still the name for the raven in Brittonic languages such as Welsh, Cornish and Breton. Perfect homonymy with Branodunum in Gaul, today Brandon (Saône-et-Loire, France).

== History ==
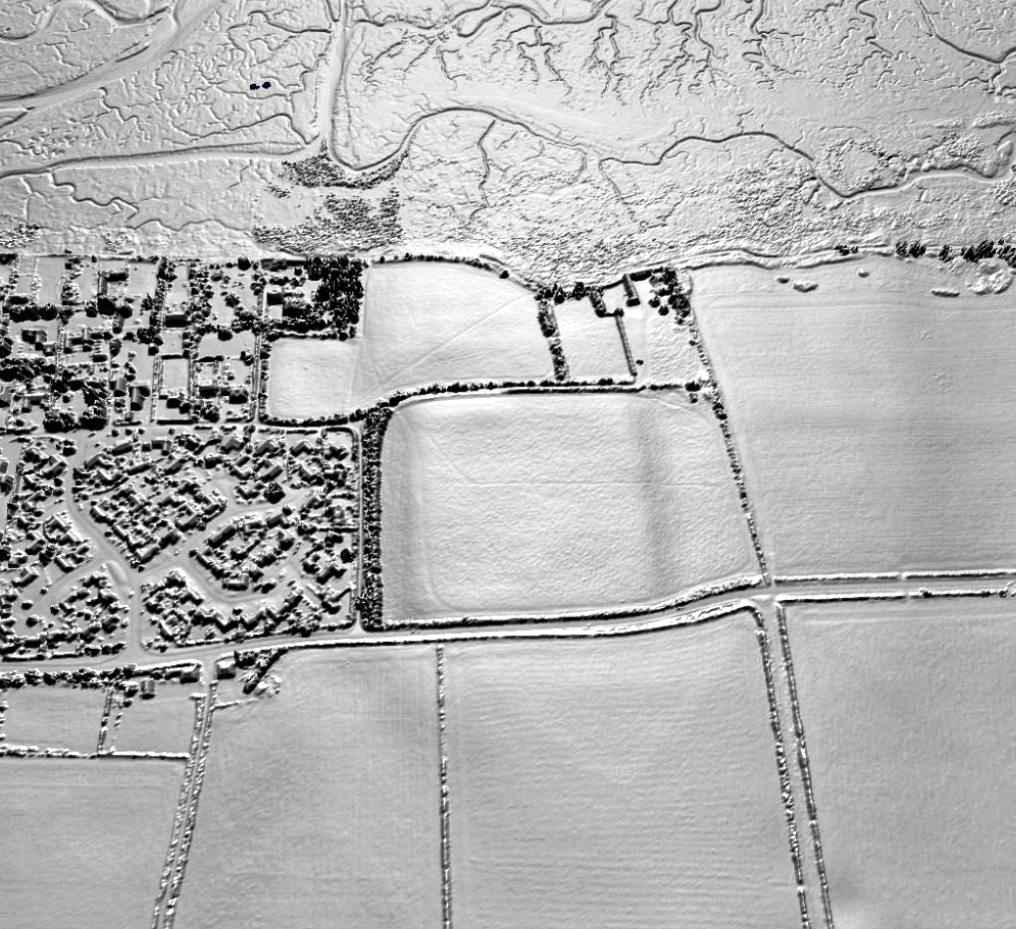
A lidar view of the site of Branodunum

The fort, built in the 230s, became later part of the eleven forts along the south and east coasts of England, known as the Saxon Shore fortification system built during the 3rd millennium AD. It was built to guard the Wash approaches and is of a typical rectangular castrum layout. According to the 4th-century document Notitia Dignitatum, the fort was garrisoned by the Equites Dalmatae Brandodunenses ("Dalmatian cavalry of Bran[d]odunum"), although a tile found on the site stamped Cohors I Aquitanorum suggests that its original garrison was the "First cohort from Aquitania". There is possible evidence (burials and grave goods) of later Anglo-Saxon use of the site.

According to the National Trust information boards on the site, the fort is within a rectangular field to the east of the current village of Brancaster; there is no urban development on the fort's site itself. Urban residential development in the 1970s has covered much of the area to the west of the fort where part of the local 'vicus' (civilian settlement) was situated.

== Location and construction ==
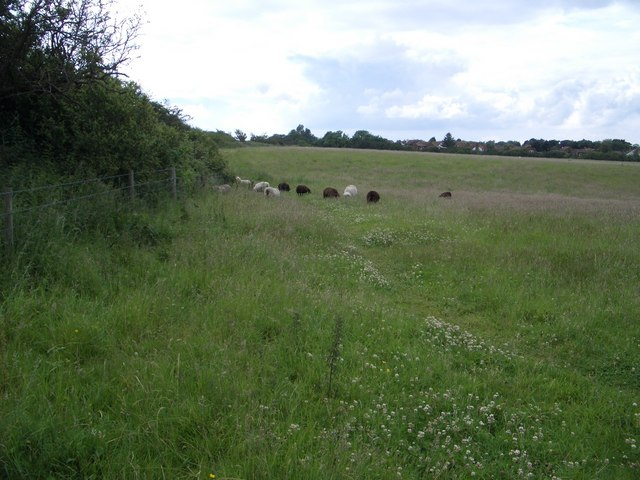
Southern boundary of the Roman fort

The site is bounded by the modern village of Brancaster to the west, and the A149 road to the south. The site is maintained by the National Trust. Free access is possible from the adjoining A149 road or the Norfolk Coast Path.

In Roman times, the fort's northern wall lay directly on the seashore, which served as a harbour. Since then, the shoreline has accreted, and the fort now lies inland of salt marshes. The fort was of a rectangular shape with rounded corners, with a 10 ft (3.0 m) wide wall with internal turrets at the corners and backed by an earthen rampart, which increased the wall's strength and gave easy access to the battlements. In front of the wall there was a V-shaped single ditch. The wall thus enclosed an area of 2.56 ha. In typical castrum fashion, the fort had four gates, one on each side. Evidence of the eastern and western gates and of flanking towers survives. Aerial survey has revealed the existence of several buildings in the fort's interior, including the principia. A civilian settlement (vicus) existed on the eastern and northern sides of the fort, which has been dated to the 2nd century AD. Its size would make it one of the largest settlements in the territory of the Iceni tribe. Because the streets of the settlement are not aligned with the layout of the fort, it has been hypothesised that an earlier fort, built of timber, existed at the site, possibly from as early as the revolt of Queen Boudica in the mid-1st century AD.

The walls still stood up to 12 feet (3.7 metres) tall in the 17th century, but robbing of materials during following centuries means that only the site and earthworks remain.

== Archaeology ==
The site provided the subject of an episode of series 20 of archaeological television programme Time Team, first broadcast in January 2013. Time Team made new discoveries which extend the knowledge base beyond that described above. In 2018 archaeological geophysicist John Gater returned to the site with Sumo Survey Services, and was able to confirm the outline of the fort and the layout of interior features like barrack rooms and major buildings.

== See also ==
- Gariannonum, Saxon Shore fort in Norfolk

== Sources ==
- Fields, Nic (2006). Rome's Saxon Shore - Coastal Defences of Roman Britain AD 250-500 (Fortress 56). Osprey Publishing. ISBN 978-1-84603-094-9.
- Johnston, David E., ed. (1977). "The Saxon Shore" (PDF). CBA Research Report (18). London: Council for British Archaeology. ISBN 0-900312-43-2.
