= Saxon Shore =

Military command during the Late Roman Empire

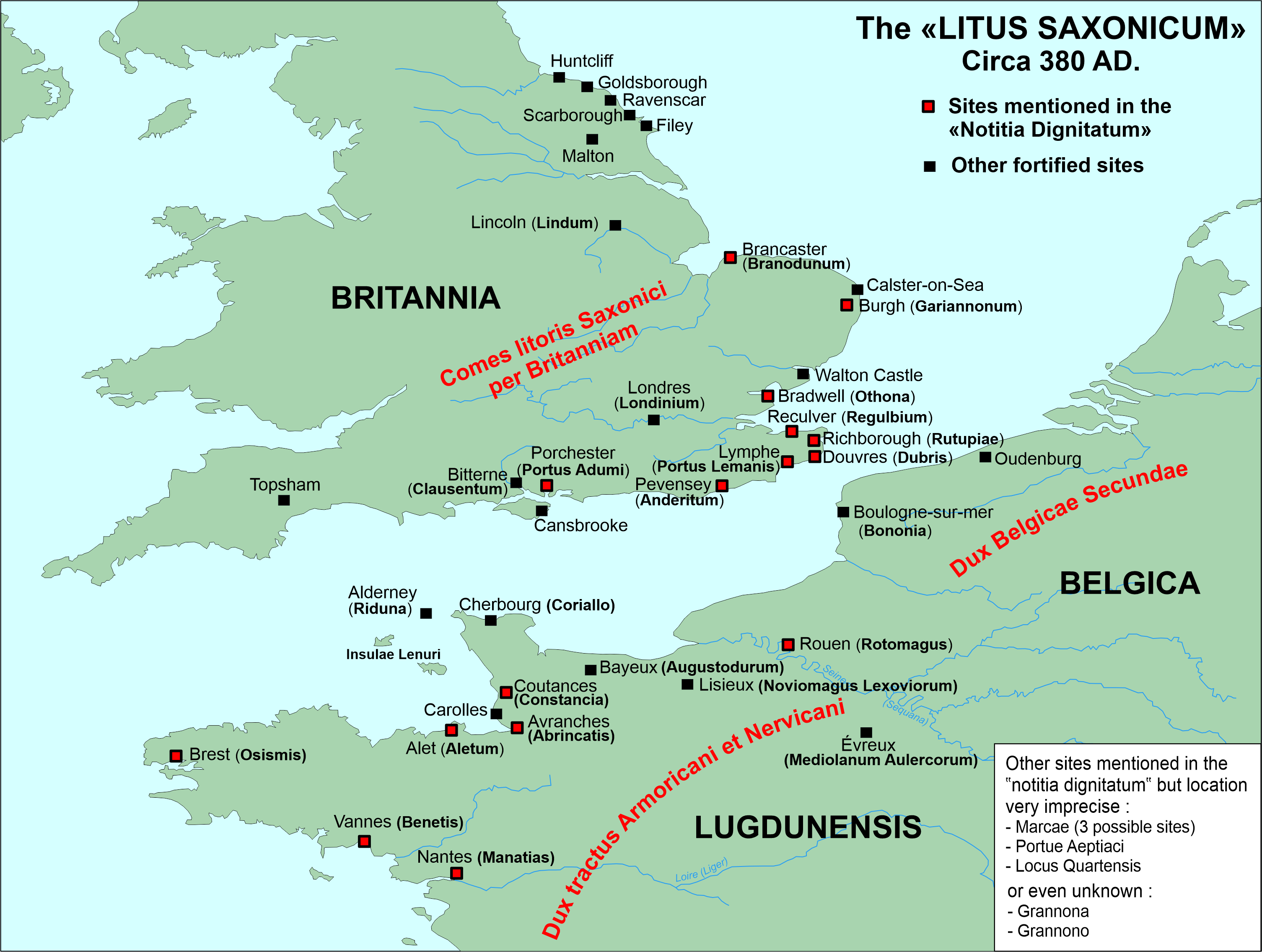
The fortifications and military commands of the Saxon Shore system extended on both sides of the Channel.

The Saxon Shore (Latin: litus Saxonicum) was a military command of the Late Roman Empire, consisting of a series of fortifications on both sides of the English Channel. It was established in the late 3rd century and was led by the "Count of the Saxon Shore". In the late 4th century, his functions were limited to Britain, while the fortifications in Gaul were established as separate commands. Several well-preserved Saxon Shore forts survive in east and south-east England; they are some of the best-preserved Roman forts surviving in the world, notable for the height and strength of their walls.

== Background ==
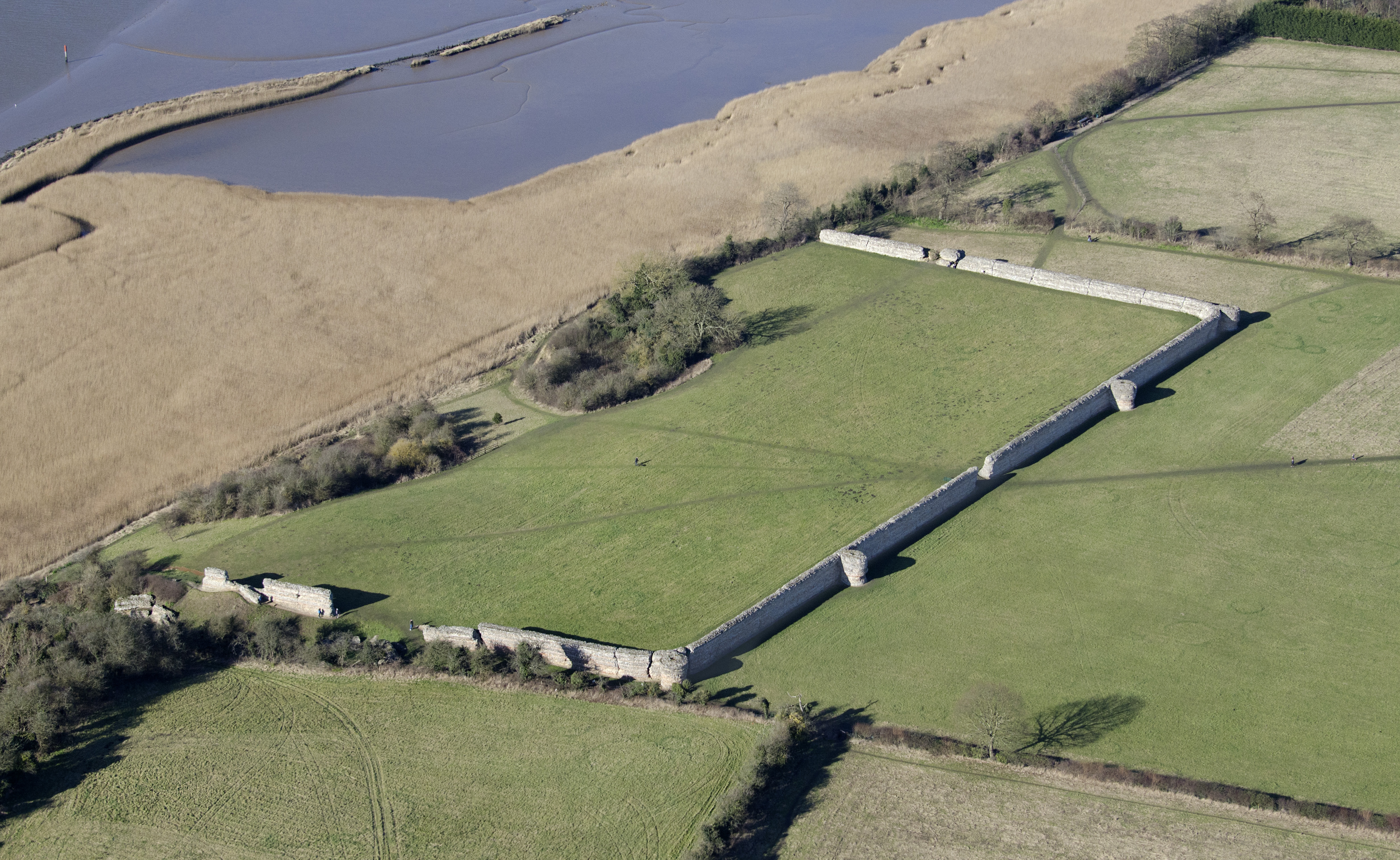
Burgh Castle in Norfolk, seen from the air.

During the latter half of the 3rd century, the Roman Empire faced a grave crisis: Weakened by civil wars, the rapid succession of short-lived emperors, and secession in the provinces, the Romans now faced new waves of attacks by barbarian tribes. Most of Britain had been part of the Roman Empire since the mid-1st century. It was protected from raids by native Celtic Britons in the north by the Hadrianic and Antonine Walls, while a fleet of some size was also available.

However, as the frontiers came under increasing external pressure, fortifications were built throughout the Empire in order to protect cities and guard strategically important locations. It is in this context that the forts of the Saxon Shore were constructed. Already in the 230s, under Severus Alexander, several units had been withdrawn from the northern frontier and garrisoned at locations in the south, and had built new forts at Brancaster and Caister-on-Sea in Norfolk and Reculver in Kent. Dover was already fortified in the early 2nd century, and the other forts in this group were constructed in the period between the 270s and 290s.

== Meaning of the term and role ==
Roman masonry, with its distinctive bands of red-brick Roman tiles, can be seen in the outer walls of the Saxon Shore fort of Anderitum, which was later re-fortified as Pevensey Castle in East Sussex. The walls appear to be still standing to their original height.

The only contemporary reference we possess that mentions the name "Saxon Shore" comes in the late 4th-century Notitia Dignitatum, which lists its commander, the Comes Litoris Saxonici per Britanniam ("Count of the Saxon Shore in Britain"), and gives the names of the sites under his command and their respective complements of military personnel. However, due to the absence of further evidence, theories have varied among scholars as to the exact meaning of the name, and also the nature and purpose of the chain of forts it refers to.

Two interpretations were put forward as to the meaning of the adjective "Saxon": either a shore attacked by Saxons, or a shore settled by Saxons. Some argue that the latter hypothesis is supported by Eutropius, who states that during the 280s the sea along the coasts of Belgica and Armorica was "infested with Franks and Saxons", and that this was why Carausius was first put in charge of the fleet there, while others believe the term infestation relates to seabourne Saxons and Franks raiding the coasts. It also receives some support from archaeological finds, as artefacts of a Germanic style have been found in burials, while there is evidence of the presence of Saxons in southern England and the northern coasts of Gaul around Boulogne-sur-Mer and Bayeux from the middle of the 5th century onwards, although this timeline coincides with the Anglo-Saxon invasion of Britain. This, in turn, could mirror a well documented practice of deliberately settling Germanic tribes (Franks became foederati in 358 AD under Emperor Julian) to strengthen Roman defences. Nevertheless, the evidence for extensive Saxon settlement in Britain typically only dates to the 5th century, later than the channel defences of the late 3rd and 4th century associated with the Saxon Shore.

The other interpretation holds that the forts fulfilled a coastal defence role against seaborne invaders, mostly Saxons and Franks, and acted as bases for the naval units operating against them. This view is reinforced by the parallel chain of fortifications across the Channel on the northern coasts of Gaul, which complemented the British forts, suggesting a unified defensive system, although this could also be accounted for the Saxons having been settled on both sides of the coast as some archeological evidence presented earlier suggests.

Other scholars like John Cotterill however consider the threat posed by Germanic raiders, at least in the 3rd and early 4th centuries, to be exaggerated. They interpret the construction of the Saxon Shore forts at Brancaster (Branodunum), Caister-on-Sea (Burgh Castle) and Reculver (Regulbium) in the early 3rd century and their location at the estuaries of navigable rivers as pointing to a different role: fortified points for transport and supply between Britain and Gaul, without any relation (at least at that time) to countering seaborne piracy. This view is supported by contemporary references to the supplying of the army of Julian the Apostate by Caesar with grain from Britain during his campaign in Gaul in 359, and their use as secure landing places by Count Theodosius during the suppression of the Great Conspiracy a few years later.

Another theory, proposed by D.A. White, was that the extended system of large stone forts was disproportionate to any threat by seaborne Germanic raiders, and that it was actually conceived and constructed during the secession of Carausius and Allectus (the Carausian Revolt) in 289–296, and with an entirely different enemy in mind: they were to guard against an attempt at reconquest by the Empire. This view, although widely disputed, has found recent support from archaeological evidence at Pevensey, which dates the fort's construction to the early 290s.

Whatever their original purpose, it is virtually certain that in the late 4th century the forts and their garrisons were employed in operations against Frankish and Saxon pirates rather than to contain Saxons in Britain itself. Britain was abandoned by Rome in 410, with Armorica following soon after. The forts on both sides continued to be inhabited in the following centuries, and in Britain in particular several continued in use well into the Anglo-Saxon period.

== The forts ==
=== In Britain ===
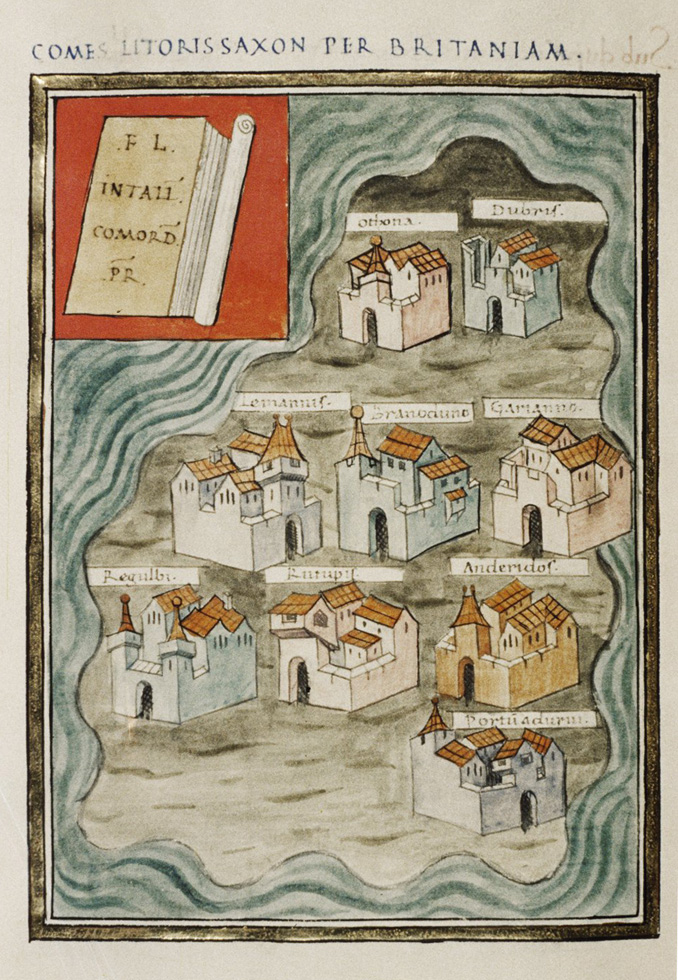
The nine British Saxon Shore forts in the Notitia Dignitatum. Bodleian Library, Oxford.

The nine forts mentioned in the Notitia Dignitatum for Britain are listed here, from north to south, with their garrisons.

- Branodunum (Brancaster, Norfolk). One of the earliest forts, dated to the 230s. It was built to guard the Wash approaches and is of a typical rectangular castrum layout. It was garrisoned by the Equites Dalmatae Brandodunenses, although evidence exists suggesting that its original garrison was the cohors I Aquitanorum.
- Gariannonum (Burgh Castle, Norfolk). Established between 260 and the mid-270s to guard the River Yare (Gariannus Fluvius), it was garrisoned by the Equites Stablesiani Gariannoneses. Although there is some discussion as to whether this is actually the fort at Caister-on-Sea, and being on the opposite bank of the same estuary as Burgh Castle.
- Othona (Bradwell-on-Sea, Essex). Garrisoned by the Numerus Fortensium.
- Regulbium (Reculver, Kent). Together with Brancaster one of the earliest forts, built in the 210s to guard the Thames estuary, it is likewise a castrum. It was garrisoned by the cohors I Baetasiorum since the 3rd century.
- Rutupiae (Richborough, Kent), garrisoned by parts of the Legio II Augusta.
- Dubris (Dover Castle, Kent), garrisoned by the Milites Tungrecani.
- Portus Lemanis (Lympne, Kent), garrisoned by the Numerus Turnacensium.
- Anderitum (Pevensey Castle, East Sussex), garrisoned by the Numerus Abulcorum.
- Portus Adurni (Portchester Castle, Hampshire), garrisoned by a Numerus Exploratorum.

There are a few other sites that clearly belonged to the system of the British branch of the Saxon Shore (the so-called "Wash–Solent limes"), although they are not included in the Notitia, such as the forts at Walton Castle, Suffolk, which has by now sunk into the sea due to erosion, and at Caister-on-Sea in Norfolk. In the south, Carisbrooke Castle on the Isle of Wight and Clausentum (Bitterne, in modern Southampton) are also regarded as westward extensions of the fortification chain. Other sites probably connected to the Saxon Shore system are the sunken fort at Skegness, and the remains of possible signal stations at Thornham in Norfolk, Corton in Suffolk and Hadleigh in Essex.

Further north on the coast, the precautions took the form of central depots at Lindum (Lincoln) and Malton with roads radiating to coastal signal stations. When an alert was relayed to the base, troops could be dispatched along the road. Further up the coast in North Yorkshire, a series of coastal watchtowers (at Huntcliff, Filey, Ravenscar, Goldsborough, and Scarborough) was constructed, linking the southern defences to the northern military zone of the Wall. Similar coastal fortifications are also found in Wales, at Cardiff and Caer Gybi. The only fort in this style in the northern military zone is Lancaster, Lancashire, built sometime in the mid-late 3rd century replacing an earlier fort and extramural community, which may reflect the extent of coastal protection on the north-west coast from invading tribes from Ireland.

=== In Gaul ===
The Notitia also includes two separate commands for the northern coast of Gaul, both of which belonged to the Saxon Shore system. However, when the list was compiled, in c. 420 AD, Britain had been abandoned by Roman forces. The first command controlled the shores of the province Belgica Secunda (roughly between the estuaries of the Scheldt and the Somme), under the dux Belgicae Secundae with headquarters at Portus Aepatiaci:

- Marcae (unidentified location near Calais, possibly Marquise or Marck), garrisoned by the Equites Dalmatae. In the Notitia, together with Grannona, it is the only site on the Gallic shore to be explicitly referred to as lying in litore Saxonico.
- Locus Quartensis sive Hornensis (probably at the mouth of the Somme), the port of the classis Sambrica ("Fleet of the Somme")
- Portus Aepatiaci (possibly Étaples), garrisoned by the milites Nervii.

Although not mentioned in the Notitia, the port of Gesoriacum or Bononia (Boulogne-sur-Mer), which until 296 was the main base of the Classis Britannica, would also have come under the dux Belgicae Secundae.

To this group also belongs the Roman fort at Oudenburg in Belgium.

Further west, under the dux tractus Armoricani et Nervicani, were mainly the coasts of Armorica, nowadays Normandy and Brittany. The Notitia lists the following sites:

- Grannona (disputed location, either at the mouths of the Seine or at Port-en-Bessin), the seat of the dux, garrisoned by the cohors prima nova Armoricana. In the Notitia, it is explicitly mentioned as lying in litore Saxonico. The location of the Roman stronghold of Grannono/Grannona may have been located within or near the boundary of Brittany - see Guérande.
- Rotomagus (Rouen), garrisoned by the milites Ursariensii
- Constantia (Coutances), garrisoned by the legio I Flavia Gallicana Constantia
- Abricantis (Avranches), garrisoned by the milites Dalmati
- Grannona (uncertain whether this is a different location than the first Grannona, perhaps Granville), garrisoned by the milites Grannonensii
- Aleto or Aletum (Aleth, near Saint-Malo), garrisoned by the milites Martensii
- Osismis (Brest), garrisoned by the milites Mauri Osismiaci
- Blabia (perhaps Hennebont), garrisoned by the milites Carronensii
- Benetis (possibly Vannes), garrisoned by the milites Mauri Beneti
- Manatias (Nantes), garrisoned by the milites superventores

In addition, there are several other sites where a Roman military presence has been suggested. At Alderney, the fort known as "The Nunnery" is known to date to Roman times, and the settlement at Longy Common has been cited as evidence of a Roman military establishment, though the archaeological evidence there is, at best, scant.

== In popular culture ==
- In 1888, Alfred Church wrote a historical novel entitled The Count of the Saxon Shore. It is available online.
- The American band Saxon Shore takes its name from the region.
- The Saxon Shore is the fourth book in Jack Whyte's Camulod Chronicles.
- Since 1980, the "Saxon Shore Way" exists, a coastal footpath in Kent which passes by many of the forts.
- David Rudkin's 1986 play The Saxon Shore takes place near Hadrian's Wall as the Romans are withdrawing from Britain.
