= Gariannonum =

Roman fort in Norfolk, England

- Gariannum
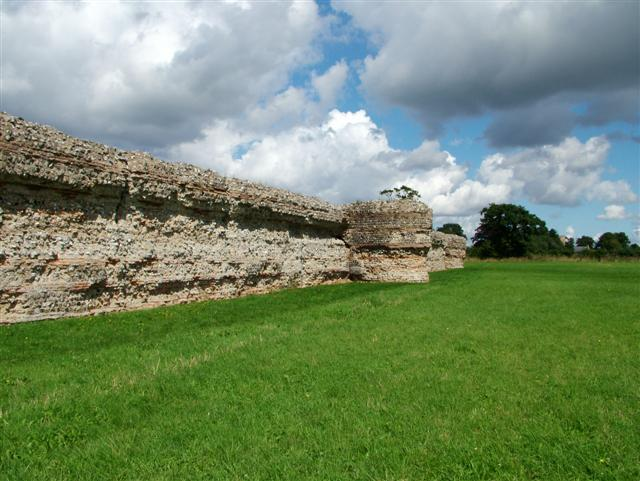
- Burgh Castle is usually identified as Gariannonum

- Location within Norfolk
- 52.582°N 1.652°E
- Location: Norfolk, England

Gariannonum, or Gariannum, was a Roman Saxon Shore fort in Norfolk, England. The Notitia Dignitatum, a Roman Army "order of battle" from about AD 400, lists nine forts of the Saxon Shore in south and east England, among which one was called Gariannonor. It has been much discussed over the years in terms of spelling (Gariannonum, Garianonum, Gariannum), purpose (whether it really was intended for defence against Saxon raids), and location (whether it was Burgh Castle or the Caister-on-Sea site). The fort is listed as being commanded by the Praepositus equitum stablesianorum, implying its garrison was a cavalry of a form originated in the late 3rd century, the Equites Stablesiani. Both proposed sites show archaeological evidence for military occupation beginning at around the time this type of unit began use.

The name Gariannonum is thought to derive from a river-name, Gariennus, mentioned in Ptolemy's Geography. This is thought to derive in turn from a Celtic root meaning "babbling river", which may refer to the River Yare, although much uncertainty remains.

== Identification ==
The situation of Gariannonum has usually been identified as either Burgh Castle, which lies on the River Waveney just before its confluence with the River Yare, or the Roman fort at Caister-on-Sea, 9 kilometres (5.6 mi) away at the mouth of the River Bure. In Roman times, both sites lay on opposite shores of a large estuary (the remnant of which is Breydon Water). The earliest proposal for its identity, made by the antiquary William Camden in the first edition of his Britannia in 1586, is that Caister was its location; but in his fifth edition of 1600 he changes his mind and suggests that Burgh Castle is the more likely. For centuries, little evidence could be brought to bear, and historians presented opposing views. While the remaining walls at Burgh Castle are clearly consistent with a late Roman fort, the military function of Caister-on-Sea was more open to doubt. A modern reassessment of the Roman settlement at Caister-on-Sea has shown that it too had a military function. The identification of Burgh Castle as Gariannonum is uncertain, and the name could apply to Caister-on-Sea. Archaeological evidence from excavations of the sites in the 1950s indicates that both were similarly occupied for military use in the 4th century, giving rise to the suggestion that the two forts together were considered as one site guarding the entire Yare estuary, with the name Gariannonum originally applied to the Caister site and then expanded when the second fort was built at the Burgh site.
