= Æthelwold of East Anglia =

King of East Anglia

Æthelwold

King of the East Angles
- Reign: c. 654–664
- Predecessor: Æthelhere
- Successor: Ealdwulf
- Died: 664
- Consort: unknown
- House: Wuffingas
- Father: Eni

Æthelwold, also known as Æthelwald or Æþelwald (Old English: Æþelwald "noble ruler"; reigned c. 654 – 664), was a 7th-century king of East Anglia, the long-lived Anglo-Saxon kingdom which today includes the English counties of Norfolk and Suffolk. He was a member of the Wuffingas dynasty, which ruled East Anglia from their regio (centre of royal authority) at Rendlesham. The two Anglo-Saxon cemeteries at Sutton Hoo, the monastery at Iken, the East Anglian see at Dommoc and the emerging port of Ipswich were all in the vicinity of Rendlesham.

Æthelwold lived during a time of political and religious upheaval in East Anglia, whose Christian kings in the decades prior to his succession all died violent deaths, having proved unequal to the task of defending the newly converted kingdom against attacks from its neighbouring kingdom, Mercia, led by its pagan king, Penda. Æthelwold was the last of the nephews of Rædwald to rule East Anglia. He died in 664 and was succeeded by Ealdwulf, the son of his brother Æthelric.

Few records relating to East Anglia have survived and almost nothing is known of Æthelwold's life or reign. He succeeded his elder brother Æthelhere, after Æthelhere was killed with Penda of Mercia at the Battle of the Winwæd in about 655. During his rule he witnessed a setback in the aspirations of Mercia to dominate its neighbours, following the Battle of the Winwæd and the murder of Penda's son, Peada.

He was king during the last decade of the co-existence in England of the Christian Roman rite, centred at Canterbury, and the Celtic rite based in Northumbria. At the Synod of Whitby, in 664, the Roman cause prevailed and the division of ecclesiastical authorities ceased. In 662, Swithelm of Essex was persuaded to adopt Christianity and was baptised at Rendlesham, with Æthelwold present as his sponsor. East Anglia became more closely allied to Northumbria, Kent and lands in the Fens by means of royal marriages such as that between the Northumbrian Hereswitha and the East Anglian Æthilric.

== Historical context ==
=== The emergence of the Kingdom of the East Angles ===
A map of the Anglo-Saxon kingdoms, including places relevant to Æthelwold's reign

The history of East Anglia and its kings is known from The Ecclesiastical History of the English People, compiled by the Northumbrian monk Bede in 731, and a genealogical list from the Anglian collection, dating from the 790s, in which the ancestry of Ælfwald of East Anglia was traced back through fourteen generations to Wōden.

East Anglia was a long-lived Anglo-Saxon kingdom in which a duality of a northern and a southern part existed, corresponding with the modern English counties of Norfolk and Suffolk. It was formed during the 5th century, following the ending of Roman power in Britain in 410. The east of Britain became settled at an early date by Saxons and Angles from the continent. During the 5th century, groups of settlers of mixed stock migrated into the Fens and up the major rivers inland. From Bede it is known that the people who settled in what became East Anglia were Angles, originally from what is now part of Denmark. By the 6th century, new settlements had also appeared along the river systems of the east coast of East Anglia, including the Deben, the Alde and the Orwell. The settlers were unaffected by Roman urban civilisation and had their own religion and language. As more of the region fell under their control, new kingdoms were formed, replacing the function of the Roman territoria. Surrounded by sea, fenland, large defensive earthworks such as the Devil's Dyke and wide rivers, all of which acted to disconnect it from the rest of Britain, the land of the East Angles eventually became united by a single ruling dynasty, the Wuffingas.

=== Rædwald and his successors ===
The first king of the East Angles of whom more than a name is known was Rædwald, described by Bede as 'the son of Tytil, whose father was Wuffa', who reigned from about 599 until approximately 624. According to Bede, he was converted to Christianity at the court of his overlord Æthelberht of Kent in about 604. Later in his reign he was powerful enough to hold imperium over several Anglo-Saxon kingdoms. In 616, he defeated Æthelfrith of Northumbria and installed the exiled Edwin as the new king. He is thought to have been given a ship burial and interred amongst a magnificent array of personal treasures and symbols of regal power that were discovered under Mound 1 at Sutton Hoo, in Suffolk. His son Eorpwald succeeded him and reigned briefly before he was killed soon after his baptism, by a heathen named Ricberht, after which the East Angles reverted to paganism. Ricberht was replaced by Sigeberht, whose Christian education ensured that Christianity was reestablished. During Sigeberht's joint reign with Ecgric, the East Anglian see at Dommoc was established.

During 632 or 633, Edwin of Northumbria was overthrown and slain and his kingdom was ravaged by Cadwallon ap Cadfan, supported by Penda of Mercia. The Mercians then turned on the East Angles and their king, Ecgric. In 640 or 641, they routed the East Anglian army in a battle in which Ecgric and his predecessor Sigeberht both perished.

Ecgric's successor, Æthelwold's brother Anna, who was renowned for his devout Christianity and the saintliness of his children, proved ineffective in preventing East Anglia from being invaded by the Mercians. Following a Mercian attack in 651 on the monastery at Cnobheresburg, Anna was exiled by Penda, possibly to the kingdom of the Magonsæte. After his return, East Anglia was attacked again by Penda, Anna's forces were defeated and he was killed. During the reign of his successor, Æthelhere (another brother of Æthelwold), East Anglia was eclipsed by Mercia. In 655, after the Battle of the Winwæd, near Leeds, in which Æthelhere was slain fighting beside Penda, a new political situation arose. Penda's son Peada, who had ruled the Mercian province of the Middle Angles as a Christian king from 653, now succeeded Penda as king of Mercia, but he was murdered a year later. Peada's death dealt a severe blow to Mercian aspirations of dominion over the other kingdoms of England.

=== The sphere of Rendlesham ===
The royal seat of Rendlesham, specified by Bede, seals the evident importance of the Deben estuary headwaters as a centre of royal power, demonstrated for an earlier period by the royal cemetery of Sutton Hoo. Rendlesham, a short distance from Iken, the site of Botolph's monastery, stands at a strategic point between the rivers Deben and Alde at the headwaters of the Butley estuary, which intersects the peninsula between the two major rivers. The dedication of Rendlesham's church to St Gregory suggests its early, perhaps primary connection with the royal dwelling mentioned by Bede. If the Dommoc bishopric was at Walton, as the monks of Rochester Cathedral claimed in the thirteenth century, then this was also immediately within the sphere of Rendlesham. Archaeologists have revealed that the quay of Gipeswic (now modern Ipswich), at a ford of the River Orwell estuary, was then growing in importance as a centre of seaborne trade to the continent, under direct royal patronage.

== Descent, family and accession ==
Æthelwold (Old English 'noble ruler') was a member of the Wuffingas dynasty, the youngest son of Eni and a nephew of Rædwald of East Anglia. Two of his brothers, Anna and Æthelhere, ruled in succession before him.

His accession is mentioned by the 12th-century historian William of Malmesbury, in Gesta Regum Anglorum:

"To Anna succeeded his brother Ethelhere, who was justly slain by Oswy king of the Northumbrians, together with Penda, because he was an auxiliary to him, and was actually supporting his brother and his kinsman. His brother Ethelwald, in due succession, left the kingdom to Adulf and Elwold, the sons of Ethelhere." (Note: "Successit Annæ frater ejus Ethelhere, occisusque est a rege Northanhimbrorum Oswio cum Penda merito, quod ei concurreret in auxilium, et fulciret exercitum qui pessum dedisset fratrem et cognatum. Hujus successor frater Ethelwaldus continuatis successionibus regnum reliquit ejusdem Ethelherii filiis Aldnlfo." (William of Malmesbury, Book 1, §97))

Dynastic alliances bound Æthelwold's kingdom strongly to the Christian kingdom of Kent, where Seaxburh, the eldest daughter of Æthelwold's elder brother Anna, was Eorcenberht of Kent's queen. East Anglia's western stronghold in the Fens was held by Seaxburh's sister Æthelthryth and, like Kent, it was devoutly attached to the Roman Church. There was also an important Northumbrian connection: in 657, Hilda established the monastery of Streoneshalh (identified with Whitby), which later became the burial-place of Edwin and other Northumbrian kings. Hilda's sister Hereswitha married Æthelwold's youngest brother Æthelric in around 627–629.

== Reign ==
=== Christianity in East Anglia under Æthelwold ===
The kingdom of East Anglia during the early Saxon period

The influence of the Celtic rite in East Anglia had been strong whilst the monastery of Saint Fursey and Saint Foillan at Cnobheresburg had existed. The authority of East Anglian Christianity still resided in the East Anglian see at Dommoc, obedient to Canterbury. Saint Botolph began to build his monastery at Iken, on a tidal island site in the River Alde, in about 653, the year that Anna was killed at the Battle of Bulcamp.

Oswiu successfully persuaded Sigeberht II of the East Saxons to receive baptism and Cedd, a Northumbrian disciple of Aidan's, was diverted from the Northumbrian mission to the Middle Angles under Peada to become Bishop of the East Saxons and re-convert the people. Cedd built monasteries at Tilbury in the south and at Ythancæster, where there was an old Roman fort, at what is now Bradwell-on-Sea, in north-east Essex. Sigebert was assassinated by his own thegns and was succeeded by the pagan Swithelm of Essex. Cedd persuaded him to accept the faith and, according to Bede, his baptism by Cedd took place at Rendlesham, in the presence of King Æthelwold:

"Sigebert was succeeded in the kingdom by Suidhelm, the son of Sexbald, who was baptized by the same Cedd, in the province of the East Angles, at the king's countryseat, called Rendelsham, that is, Rendil's Mansion; and Ethelwald, king of the East Angles, brother to Anna, king of the same people, was his godfather." (Note: "Successit autem Sigbercto inregnum Suidhelm, filius Sexbaldi, qui baptizatus est ab ipso Cedde in prouincia Orientalium Anglorum, in uico regio, qui dicitur Rendlasham, id est mansio Rendili; suscepitque eum ascendentem de fonto sancto Aediluald rex ipsius gentis Orientalium Anglorum, frater Anna regis eorundem." (Bede, iii, 22))

=== East Anglian marriage alliances ===
In the early 660s, two important marriages took place. Ecgfrith of Northumbria, the fifteen-year-old son of Oswiu, married Æthelthryth of Ely, the daughter of Anna of East Anglia (who was about fourteen years older than him), and moved to live with him at his Northumbrian court. She had remained a virgin for Christ during her first marriage; she continued in this resolve as Ecgfrityh's bride, with the result that he could not expect to father an heir. Æthelthryth retained Ely as her own possession during this marriage.

Meanwhile, Wulfhere of Mercia, a brother of Peada, emerged from safe retreat and was proclaimed king. He was not Christian, but was soon converted and subsequently married Eormenhilda, daughter of Eorcenberht of Kent and Seaxburh. Soon afterwards he founded the monastery of Medeshamstede, which later became known as Peterborough, under abbot Seaxwulf.

== Synod of Whitby ==
Following the death of Finan, bishop of Lindisfarne, Alhfrith of Deira, in collusion with Wilfred of York, Agilbert of Wessex and others, were determined to persuade Oswiu to rule in favour of the Roman rite of Christianity within the kingdoms over which he had imperium. The case was debated in Oswiu's presence at the Synod of Whitby in 664, with Colmán, Hild and Cedd defending the Celtic rite and the tradition inherited from Aidan, and Wilifred speaking for the Roman position. The Roman cause prevailed and the former division of ecclesiastical authorities was set aside. Those who could not accept it, including Colmán, departed elsewhere.

At that time plague swept through Europe and Anglo-Saxon England. Amongst its victims was Bishop Cedd, Archbishop Deusdedit of Canterbury, and Eorconbehrt of Kent. Æthelwold also died in 664.

== Bibliography ==
- Bede, Historia ecclesiastica gentis Anglorum, ed. and tr. Colgrave, Bertram; Mynors, Roger AB (1969). Bede's Ecclesiastical History of the English People. Oxford Medieval Texts. Oxford: Clarendon Press. ISBN 0-1982-2202-5.
- Plunkett, Steven (2005). Suffolk in Anglo-Saxon Times. Stroud: Tempus. ISBN 0-7524-3139-0.
- Bosworth, Joseph (1838). A Dictionary of the Anglo-Saxon Language. London: Longman. OCLC 465899961.
- West, S.E.; Scarfe, N.; Camp, R.J. (1984), Iken, St Botolph, and the Coming of East Anglian Christianity, vol. 35, Proc. Suffolk Institute of Archaeology, pp. 279–301
- Kirby, D. P. (2000). The Earliest English Kings. London and New York: Routledge. ISBN 0-4152-4211-8.
- Lapidge, Michael (2001). The Blackwall Encyclopaedia of Anglo-Saxon England. Oxford: Blackwell. ISBN 978-0-631-22492-1.
- Plunkett, Steven (2005). Suffolk in Anglo-Saxon Times. Stroud: Tempus. ISBN 0-7524-3139-0.
- Stenton, Sir Frank (1988). Anglo-Saxon England. New York: Oxford University Press. ISBN 0-19-821716-1.
- Warner, Peter (1996). The origins of Suffolk. Manchester and New York: Manchester University Press. ISBN 0-7190-3817-0.
- Whitelock, D. (1972). "The Pre-Viking Age Church in East Anglia". Anglo-Saxon England. 1. Cambridge: Cambridge University Press: 1–22. doi:10.1017/s0263675100000053. S2CID 161209303.
- William of Malmesbury (1867) [12th century]. Giles, J. A. (ed.). William of Malmesbury's 'Chronicle of the Kings of England from the Earliest Period to the Reign of King Stephen'. London: Bohn.
- William of Malmesbury (1840) [12th century]. Willelmi Malmesbiriensis Monachi Gesta Regum Anglorum (in Latin). Vol. 1. London: Sumptibus Societatis. pp. 133–137.
- Yorke, Barbara (2002). Kings and Kingdoms of Early Anglo-Saxon England. London and New York: Routledge. ISBN 0-415-16639-X.

English royalty
Preceded by Æthelhere	King of East Anglia; 654–664	Succeeded by Ealdwulf
