= Æthelhere of East Anglia =

King of East Anglia (r. 653–655)

Æthelhere

King of the East Angles
- Reign: 653 or 654 – 655
- Predecessor: Anna
- Successor: Æthelwold
- Died: 15 November 655; Battle of the Winwaed
- House: Wuffingas
- Father: Eni
- Religion: Christianity

Æthelhere (died 15 November 655) was King of East Anglia from 653 or 654 until his death. He was a member of the ruling Wuffingas dynasty and one of three sons of Eni to rule East Anglia as Christian kings. He was a nephew of Rædwald, who was the first of the Wuffingas of which more than a name is known.

Rædwald and his son Eorpwald both ruled as pagans before being converted to Christianity. After Eorpwald's murder in around 627, the East Angles briefly reverted to heathenism, before Christianity was re-established by Sigeberht. Sigeberht eventually abdicated in favour of his co-ruler Ecgric, after which the East Angles were defeated in battle by the Mercians, led by their king Penda, during which both Ecgric and Sigeberht were slain. The monks at Cnobheresburg were driven out by Penda in 651 and Ecgric's successor Anna was forced into temporary exile. In 653 Penda once again attacked East Anglia and at the Battle of Bulcamp, Anna and his son were slain and the East Anglian army was defeated. Æthelhere then became king of the East Angles, possibly ruling jointly with his surviving brother, Æthelwold. During Æthelhere's brief reign, it is known that Botolph's monastery at Iken was built.

In 655, Æthelhere was one of thirty noble warlords who joined with Penda in an invasion of Northumbria, laying siege to Oswiu and the much smaller Northumbrian army. The battle was fought on 15 November 655, near the Winwaed, an unidentified river. The Northumbrians were victorious and many of the Mercians and their allies were killed or drowned. In the battle, Penda and nearly all his warlords, including Æthelhere, were killed.

== Sources ==
In contrast with the kingdoms of Northumbria, Mercia and Wessex, little reliable evidence about the Kingdom of the East Angles has survived, as a result of the destruction of the kingdom's monasteries and the disappearance of the two East Anglian sees that occurred as the result of Viking raids and settlement. The primary source for information about Æthelhere's life and brief reign is the Historia ecclesiastica gentis Anglorum (Ecclesiastical History of the English People), completed in Northumbria by Bede in 732.

== Background ==
The main Anglo-Saxon kingdoms

After the end of Roman rule in Britain, the region now known as East Anglia was settled by a North Germanic group known as the Angles, although there is evidence of early settlement of the region by a minority of other peoples, for instance the Swabians, who settled in the area around the modern town of Swaffham. By 600, a number of kingdoms had begun to form in the territories of southern Britain conquered by the Angles, Saxons, Jutes and Frisians. The ruling dynasty of East Anglia was the Wuffingas, named from Wuffa, an early king. The first king known to have ruled is Rædwald, whose reign spanned a quarter of a century from about 599.

Æthelhere was probably the second of the sons of Eni, the brother of Rædwald. Four sons are certainly known: Æthilric, the father of Ealdwulf, Anna, Æthelhere and Æthelwold, his successor. The brothers all appear to have been firmly committed to Christian rule: Æthilric married the Christian Hereswith, the great-niece of Edwin of Northumbria. Anna is described by Bede as almost a saintly figure and the father of a most religious family, who brought about the conversion of Cenwalh of Wessex, and Æthelwold was the sponsor of Swithelm of Essex during his baptism.

Æthelhere witnessed the fortunes of his dynasty during the years of Rædwald's rule and afterwards. The East Angles under Rædwald had been converted to Christianity, but in around 627, during the reign of his son Eorpwald, they reverted to heathenism. This occurred after Eorpwald was killed by a pagan soon after his succession and baptism. The assassin, Ricberht, may then have ruled the kingdom for a few years, to be succeeded by Sigeberht, who re-established Christianity in the kingdom and became the first East Anglian king to act as a patron of the Church.

== Mercian destabilization of the East Angles ==
Sigeberht abdicated in favor of his co-ruler Ecgric and retired to lead a monastic life, but soon afterwards the East Angles were attacked by Mercian forces, led by their king, Penda. Ecgric and his army appealed to Sigeberht to lead them into battle against the Mercians, but he refused to participate. He was dragged from his monastery to the battlefield, where, still refusing to bear arms or fight, he and Ecgric were slain and the defeated East Anglian army was destroyed.

Ecgric's successor, Anna, acted as a challenge to the increasing power of Penda throughout his reign. In 645, after Cenwalh of Wessex had renounced his wife, who was Penda's sister, Penda drove him from his kingdom and into exile. Anna was strong enough to offer protection to Cenwalh when he sought refuge at the East Anglian court: whilst there he was converted to Christianity, returning in 648 to rule Wessex as a Christian king. Anna probably provided military support for Cenwalh's return to his throne.

During the late 640s, the Irish monk Fursey, having spent a year as a hermit, left East Anglia for Gaul. His monastery at Cnobheresburg (identified by some with Burgh Castle) was left in the hands of his half-brother, Foillan. In 651, shortly after his departure, the heathen threat he had foreseen became a reality, when Foillan and his community were driven out by Penda's forces and Anna, who encountered Penda at Cnobheresburg, was exiled.

== Reign ==
In 653 or early 654, after Anna had returned from exile, Penda was able to direct a military assault upon the East Angles. The Mercian and East Anglian armies fought at Bulcamp (near Blythburgh in Suffolk), where Anna and his son were slain and the East Anglian army was slaughtered in large numbers. Æthelhere then succeeded his brother as Penda's client-king, although Barbara Yorke has suggested that Æthelhere and his surviving brother Æthelwold may have reigned jointly, as Bede separately refers to both men as Anna's successor.

Æthelhere's short reign, during which Brigilsus remained bishop of the see of Dommoc, witnessed the construction of Botolph's monastery at Iken. The site lay within the sphere of Rendlesham and Sutton Hoo. Æthelhere would have arranged his brother's funeral, whose reputed burial-site was at Blythburgh.

== Battle of the Winwæd ==
During 655, Æthelhere joined with Penda in an assault on Northumbria. Steven Plunkett asserts that Æthelhere's motive for changing sides was to deflect Penda's attention from East Anglia and the destruction of his kingdom that would have ensued. Penda invaded Northumbria with a force of thirty duces regii (or royal commanders) under his command that included a large contingent of Britons. He laid siege to Oswiu at Maes Gai, in the district of Loidis, which was probably at that time within the sphere of influence of the British kingdom of Rheged. Oswiu offered him a great ransom of treasure which, according to Bede, was refused (or according to the Historia Brittonum, was accepted and distributed) — in either case Penda resolved on battle and the destruction of the Northumbrians. Oswiu had a much smaller force, but in the event the Welsh armies of King Cadfæl of Gwynedd decamped on the eve of battle and Penda's ally Œthelwald of Deira stood aside to await the outcome.

The "major setpiece battle", according to Barbara Yorke, was fought on 15 November 655, on the banks of the River Winwæd, the location of which has not been identified. The waters of the Winwæd were in spate owing to heavy rains and had flooded the land. The Northumbrians were victorious, the Mercian forces were slaughtered and many of them drowned in flight. Penda himself was killed, together with nearly all his allies, including Æthelhere of East Anglia, who was leading the East Anglian part of the forces ranged against Oswiu:

Among whom was Ethelhere, brother and successor to Anna, king of the East Angles. He had been the occasion of the war, and was now killed, having lost his army and auxiliaries.

— Bede, Historia ecclesiastica gentis Anglorum, III, Ch. 24

Although the passage from Bede suggests that Æthelhere was the cause of the war—auctor ipse belli—it has been argued that an issue of punctuation in later manuscripts confused Bede's meaning on this point, and that he in fact meant to refer to Penda as being responsible for the war. According to the 12th century Historia Anglorum, the deaths of five Anglo-Saxon kings were avenged:

At the Winwed was avenged the slaughter of Anna,
The slaughter of the kings Sigbert and Ecgric,
The slaughter of the kings Oswald and Edwin.

— Henry of Huntingdon, Historia Anglorum, Book III

== Footnotes ==
English royalty
| Preceded by Anna | King of East Anglia; 653/654 – 655 | Succeeded by Æthelwold |
