= Anna of East Anglia =

Anna
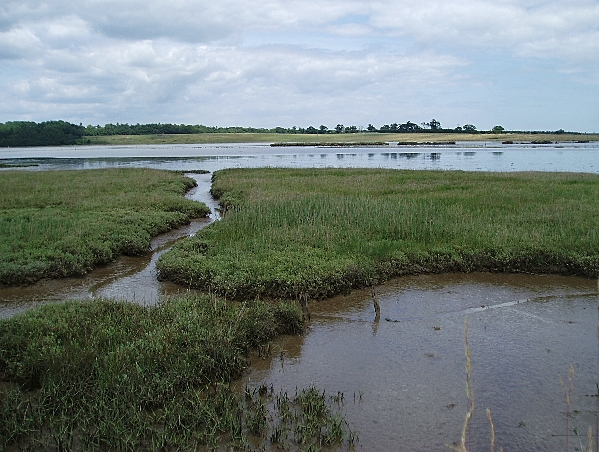
- Marshland around Blythburgh, near where Anna met his death

King of the East Angles
- Reign: c. 636 – 654 AD
- Predecessor: Ecgric
- Successor: Æthelhere
- Died: 653 or 654 AD; Battle of Bulcamp
- Burial: probably Blythburgh, Suffolk, now lost
- Consort: Sæwara
- Issue: Jurmin; Seaxburh; Æthelthryth; Æthelburh possibly Wihtburh
- House: Wuffingas
- Father: Eni
- Religion: Christian

Anna (or Onna; killed 653 or 654) was king of East Anglia from the early 640s until his death. He was a member of the Wuffingas family, the ruling dynasty of the East Angles, and one of the three sons of Eni who ruled the kingdom of East Anglia, succeeding some time after Ecgric was killed in battle by Penda of Mercia. Anna was praised by Bede for his devotion to Christianity and was renowned for the saintliness of his family: his son Jurmin and all his daughters—Seaxburh, Æthelthryth, Æthelburh and possibly a fourth, Wihtburh—were canonised.

Little is known of Anna's life or his reign, as few records have survived from this period. In 631 he may have been at Exning, close to the Devil's Dyke. In 645 Cenwalh of Wessex was driven from his kingdom by Penda and, due to Anna's influence, he was converted to Christianity while living as an exile at the East Anglian court. Upon his return from exile, Cenwalh re-established Christianity in his own kingdom and the people of Wessex then remained firmly Christian.

Around 651 the land around Ely was absorbed into East Anglia, following the marriage of Anna's daughter Æthelthryth. Anna richly endowed the coastal monastery at Cnobheresburg. In 651, in the aftermath of an attack by Penda on Cnobheresburg, Anna was forced to flee into exile, perhaps to the western kingdom of the Magonsæte. He returned to East Anglia in about 653, but soon afterwards the kingdom was attacked again by Penda and at the Battle of Bulcamp the East Anglian army, led by Anna, was defeated by the Mercians, and both Anna and his son Jurmin were killed. Anna was succeeded by his brother, Æthelhere. Botolph's monastery at Iken may have been built in commemoration of the king. After Anna's reign, East Anglia seems to have been eclipsed by its more powerful neighbour, Mercia.

== Sources ==
The kingdom of East Anglia (Old English: Ēast Engla Rīce) was a small independent Anglo-Saxon kingdom that comprised what are now the English counties of Norfolk and Suffolk and perhaps the eastern part of the Cambridgeshire Fens.

In contrast to the kingdoms of Northumbria, Mercia and Wessex, little reliable evidence about the kingdom of the East Angles has survived, because of the destruction of its monasteries and the disappearance of the two East Anglian sees that occurred as the result of Viking raids and settlement. The main primary sources for information about Anna's life and reign are the Historia ecclesiastica gentis Anglorum (Ecclesiastical History of the English People), completed in Northumbria by Bede in 731, and the Anglo-Saxon Chronicle, initially written in the ninth century, which mentions Anna's death. The mediaeval work known as the Liber Eliensis, written in Ely in the twelfth century, is a source of information about Anna's daughters, and also describes his death and burial.

== Early life and marriage ==
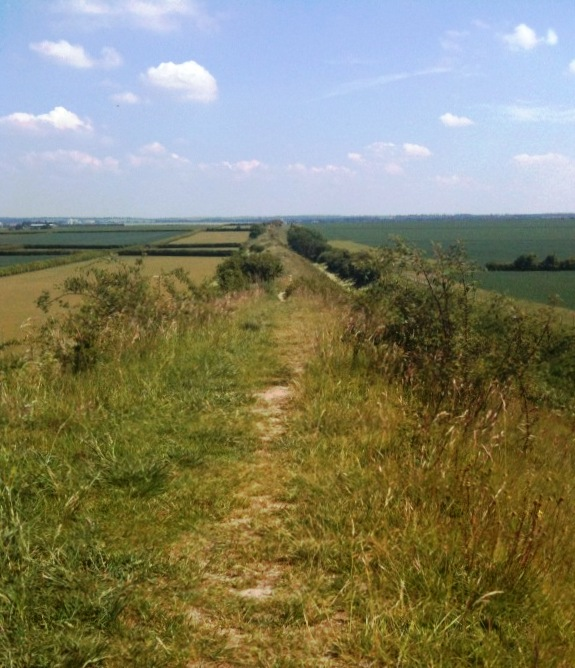
The Devil's Dyke, near Exning. Anna may have been at Exning in 631.

Anna was the son of Eni, a member of the ruling Wuffingas family, and nephew of Rædwald, king of the East Angles from 600 to 625. East Anglia was an early and long-lived Anglo-Saxon kingdom in which a duality of a northern and a southern part existed, corresponding with the modern English counties of Norfolk and Suffolk.

Anna was married; Bede refers to the saint Sæthryth as "daughter of the wife of Anna, king of the East Angles". In Abbott Folcard's Life of St Botolph, written in the 11th century, Botolph is described as having been at one time the chaplain to the sisters of a king, Æthelmund, whose mother was named Sæwara. Folcard names two of Sæwara's kinsmen as Æthelhere and Æthelwold. Since these are the names of two of Anna's brothers, Steven Plunkett suggests that it is "tempting" to consider that Sæwara was married to Anna, and that Æthelmund might either be Anna's full name, or the name of an otherwise unknown East Anglian sub-king.

The Liber Eliensis, on the other hand, names Hereswith, the sister of Hild, abbess of Whitby, as Anna's wife and the mother of Sæthryth, Seaxburh of Ely and Æthelthryth. However, the Liber Eliensis is regarded with caution by historians: Rosalind Love says that the mediaeval writers who interpreted Bede's information about Hereswith made an "erroneous assumption" regarding her connection with Anna and his family. Bede is clear that Hereswith had left East Anglia as a widow before Hild visited the kingdom, at which time Anna was very much alive. Historians now believe that Hereswith was Anna's sister-in-law, and some have thought that around the time that she married into the East Anglian royal family, Anna had already been king for a decade.

In 631 Anna was probably at the Suffolk village of Exning, an important settlement with royal connections, and, according to the Liber Eliensis, the birthplace of his daughter Æthelthryth. By tradition, Æthelthryth is said to have been baptised at Exning in a pool known as St Mindred's Well. Exning was an important place strategically, as it stood just on the East Anglian side of the Devil's Dyke, a major earthwork stretching between the Fen edge and the headwaters of the River Stour, built at an earlier date to defend the East Anglian region from attack. An early Anglo-Saxon cemetery discovered there suggests the existence of an important site nearby, possibly a royal estate or regio.

== King of the East Angles ==
=== Accession and rule ===
The main Anglo-Saxon kingdoms

During 632 or 633 Edwin of Northumbria, with his centre of Christian power north of the River Humber, was overthrown. Edwin was slain and Northumbria was ravaged by Cadwallon ap Cadfan, supported by the Mercian king, Penda. The Mercians then turned on the kingdom of the East Angles and their king, Ecgric. At an unknown date (possibly in the early 640s), they routed the East Anglian army and Ecgric and his predecessor Sigeberht were both slain. D. P. Kirby has suggested that as Sigeberht was alive when the Irish monk Fursey left for Gaul and found Erchinoald, (which happened after Erchinoald became Mayor of the Neustrian palace in 641), Sigeberht was probably killed around 640 or 641. Penda's victory marked the end of the line of kings of the East Angles who were directly descended from Rædwald. Some time after Penda's victory, Anna became king of the East Angles, though the date of his accession is quite uncertain. The Liber Eliensis says that Anna died in the nineteenth year of his reign, and since he died in the mid-650s this would indicate a date around 635. However, the Liber Eliensis is regarded by some historians as unreliable on this point, and Barbara Yorke suggests a possible date in the early 640s for Anna's accession, noting that it could not have been after 645 as Anna is recorded as giving refuge to Cenwalh of Wessex in that year. (Note: Bede gives the story without dates, but makes it clear that Anna was king when Cenwalh came to East Anglia; the Anglo-Saxon Chronicle gives the date as 645 or 646 but does not specify that Anna was king at the time.) It is probable that Anna became king with the assistance of the northern Angles. Throughout his reign he was the victim of Mercian aggression under Penda, but he also seems to have challenged the rise of Penda's power. Due to their rivalry for control over the Middle Anglian people, Mercia and East Anglia probably became hereditary enemies and Penda repeatedly attacked the East Angles from the mid-630s to 654.

Anna arranged an important diplomatic marriage between his daughter Seaxburh and Eorcenberht of Kent, cementing an alliance between the two kingdoms. It was by means of marriages such as this that the kings of Kent became well-connected to other royal dynasties. Not all of Anna's daughters were married into other royal families. During the 640s Anna's daughter Æthelburg and his stepdaughter Sæthryth entered Faremoutiers Abbey in Gaul to live religious lives under abbess Fara. They were the first royal Anglo-Saxons to become nuns, making religious seclusion "an acceptable and desirable vocation for ex-queens and royal princesses", according to Barbara Yorke. (Note: A Christian king like Anna would have made a priority of demonstrating his commitment to his kingdom's new faith by acting in a way that would mark them out as holy, and the patronage of nunneries would have been of concern to him. It is not recorded why Anna's daughters took the veil. Yorke comments on the paucity of written documents regarding the princesses of East Anglia, considering the important role they played in the foundation of Anglo-Saxon royal nunneries.)

D. P. Kirby uses the presence of East Anglian princesses living under the veil in Gaul as evidence of the Frankish orientation of Anna's kingdom at this time, continued since the reign of his predecessor Rædwald. The Wuffingas dynasty may have been connected with monastic foundations in the area around Faramoutiers through Anna's predecessor Sigeberht, who had spent several years as an exile in Gaul and had become a devout and learned Christian due to his experiences of monastic life.

The kingdom of East Anglia during the reign of Anna

In 641 Oswald of Northumbria was slain in battle by Penda (probably at Oswestry in Shropshire). Due to his death, Northumbria was split into two. The northern part, Bernicia, accepted Oswald's brother Oswiu as their new king, but the southern Deirans refused to accept him and were ruled instead by a king of the original Deiran house, Oswine. Soon afterwards Cenwalh of Wessex, the brother of Oswald's widow and himself married to Penda's sister, renounced his wife. In 645, according to the Anglo-Saxon Chronicle, Penda drove Cenwalh from his kingdom and into exile. During the following year, while a refugee at Anna's court, he was converted to Christianity, returning in 648 to rule Wessex as a Christian king. Anna probably provided military support for Cenwalh's return to his throne.

Anna's hold on the western limits of his kingdom, which bordered on the Fen lands that surrounded the Isle of Ely, was strengthened by the marriage in 651 (or slightly later) of his daughter Æthelthryth to Tondberht, a prince of the South Gyrwe, a people living in the fens who may have been settled in the area around Ely. (Note: A map of southern England in the 8th century (drawn by Reginald Piggott) gives an indication of where the Gyrwe people lived – between East Anglia and the land of the Middle Angles.) Æthelthryth, accompanied by her minister Owine, travelled from Ely to Northumbria when she married for the second time, to Ecgfrith.

=== Exile ===
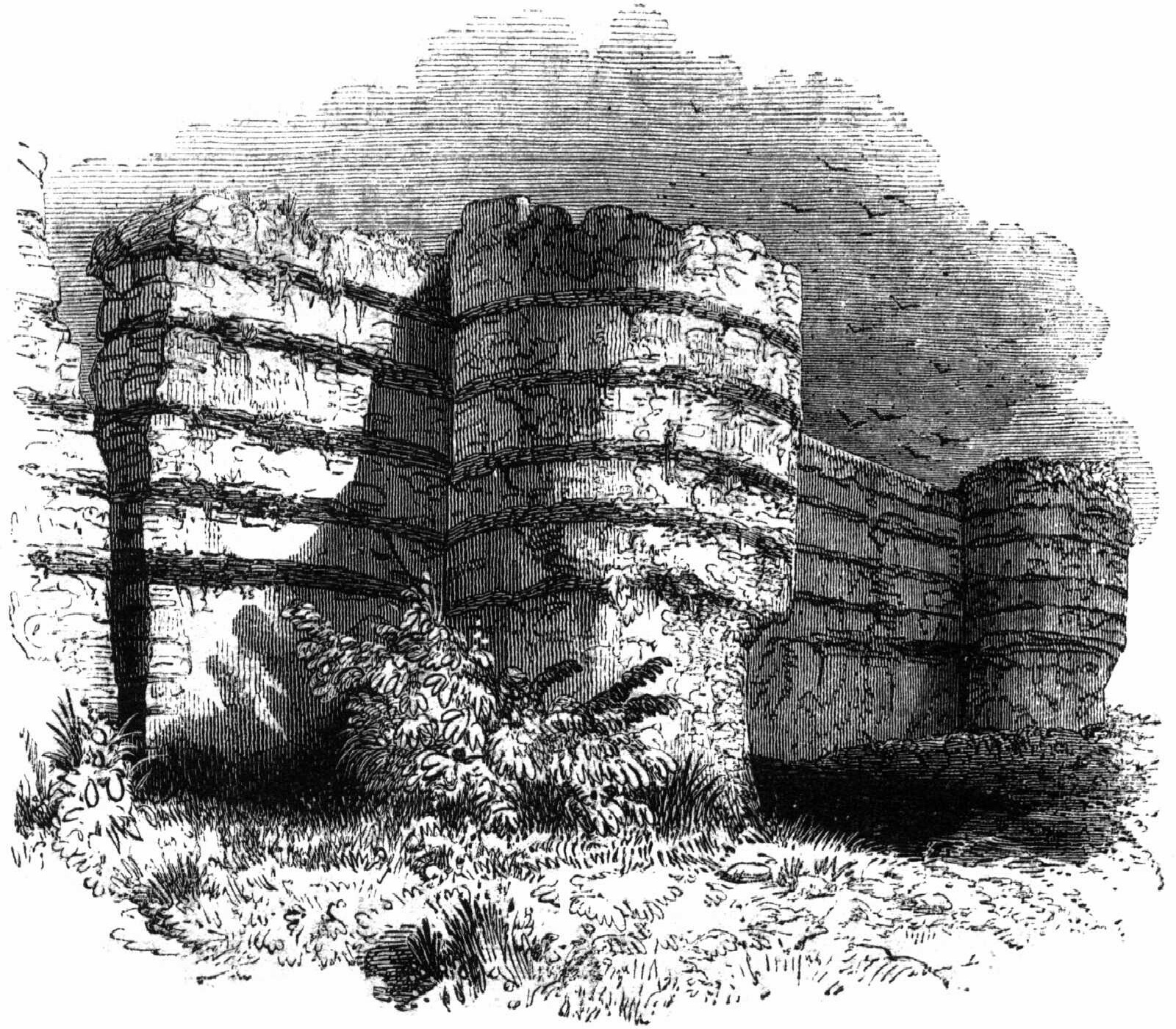
The ruins of Burgh Castle, the possible site of the monastery at Cnobheresburg, as depicted in 1845

During his reign Anna endowed the monastery at Cnobheresburg with rich buildings and objects. The monastery was built in about 633 by Fursey after he arrived in East Anglia. In time, weary of attacks on the kingdom, Fursey left East Anglia for good, leaving the monastery to his brother Foillan. When in 651 Penda attacked the monastery, Anna and his men arrived and held the Mercians back. This gave Foillan and his monks enough time to escape with their books and valuables, but Penda defeated Anna and drove him into exile, possibly to the kingdom of Merewalh of the Magonsætan, in western Shropshire. He returned to East Anglia in about 654.

=== Death, burial place and successors ===
Soon after 653, when Penda made his son Peada the ruler of the Middle Angles (but still continued to rule his own country), the Mercian assault on East Anglia was repeated. The opposing armies of Penda and Anna met at Bulcamp, near Blythburgh in Suffolk. The East Anglians were defeated and many were slain, including King Anna and his son Jurmin. Anna's death is mentioned in the Anglo-Saxon Chronicle in the entry for 653 or 654, "Her Anna cining werð ofslagen ..." – 'Here Anna was killed' – but no other details of the battle in which he died are given. (Note: Manuscript A of the Anglo-Saxon Chronicle dates Onna's death at 654; Anna's demise is dated by Manuscript E at 653. See Swanton, Anglo-Saxon Chronicle, pp. xv–xvi for a discussion of some of the discrepancies between the different manuscripts and possible reasons for these.)

A drawing of the writing-tablet found near a possible monastic site at Blythburgh

Blythburgh, a mile from Bulcamp and situated near the fordable headwaters of the Blyth estuary, was afterwards believed to be the location of the tombs of Anna and Jurmin. It is a candidate for a monastic site or a royal regio (estate). According to Peter Warner, the Latin derivation of part of the nearby place-name 'Bulcamp' indicates its ancient origins, and mediaeval sources which claim continuous Christian worship at Blythburgh throughout the Anglo-Saxon period provide circumstantial evidence of its connections with East Anglian royalty and Christianity. Part of an 8th-century whalebone diptych or writing-tablet, used for liturgical purposes, has been found near the site.

Saint Botolph began to build his monastery at Icanho, now conclusively identified as Iken, Suffolk, in the year that Anna was killed, possibly to commemorate the king. Anna was succeeded in turn by his two brothers Æthelhere and Æthelwold, who may have ruled jointly. It is possible that Æthelhere was set up as a puppet ruler by Penda or was his ally, as he was one of the 30 duces that accompanied Penda when he attacked Oswiu of Northumbria at an unidentified location called the Winwæd in 655 or 656. Penda himself was killed at the Winwæd, after having steadily increased his power over a period of 13 years. Æthelhere (who was also slain at the Battle of the Winwæd) and Æthelwold were succeeded by the descendants of Anna's youngest brother, Æthelric.

Bede praised Anna's piety in his Ecclesiastical History of the English People, and modern historians have since regarded Anna as a devout king, but his reputation as a devoted Christian is mainly because he produced a son and four daughters who were all made into Anglo-Saxon saints. Five hundred years after his death, his tomb at Blythburgh was (according to the Liber Eliensis) still "venerated by the pious devotion of faithful people".

== Family ==
Anna's children were all canonised. The eldest, Seaxburh, was the wife of Eorcenberht of Kent. She ruled Kent from 664 until her son Ecgberht came of age. Æthelthryth, according to the Anglo-Saxon Chronicle, founded the monastery at Ely in 673. Another daughter, Æthelburh, spent her life at the nunnery of Faremoutiers. Anna's son, Jurmin, was of warrior age in 653 when he was killed in battle.

By tradition, Anna is said to have had a fourth daughter, Wihtburh, an abbess at Dereham (or possibly West Dereham), where there was a royal double monastery. She may never have existed: Bede fails to mention her and she first appears in a calendar in the late 10th century Bosworth Psalter. She may have been a character specifically created by the religious community at Ely, where her remains were supposed to have been taken after being stolen from Dereham and subsequently used as visual proof of the incorruptibility of a saint's body, a substitute for her sister Æthelthryth, whose body had to remain unexamined in her tomb. Manuscript F of the Anglo-Saxon Chronicle, which dates from about 1100, mentions Wihtburh's death when it records that her body was found uncorrupted in 798, 55 years after she died. The resulting date for her death of 743 is far too late for her to have been a sister of Æthelthryth, who was born in 636.

Family of Anna of East Anglia

Tytila of East Anglia
Eni of East Anglia
Anna of East Anglia	Sæwara	Æthelhere of East Anglia	Æthelwold of East Anglia	Æthelric
Eorcenberht of Kent	Seaxburh of Ely	Æthelthryth	1. Tondberht	Æthelburh	Jurmin	Wihtburh	Ealdwulf of East Anglia
2. Ecgfrith of Northumbria
Ermenilda	Wulfhere of Mercia	Ercongota	Ecgberht of Kent	Hlothhere of Kent

== Footnotes ==
English royalty
Preceded by Ecgric	King of East Anglia possibly early 640s – 653 or 654	Succeeded by Æthelhere
