= Hereswith =

Northumbrian saint

Hereswith or Hereswitha (Old English: Hereswiþ), also spelt Hereswithe, Hereswyde or Haeresvid, was a 7th-century Northumbrian saint. She married into the East Anglian royal dynasty and afterwards retired to Gaul to lead a religious life. Hereswith's sister was Saint Hilda (or Hild), founder of the monastery at Whitby. Details of her life and identity come from Bede's Historia Ecclesiastica, the Anglian collection and the Lives of Edwin of Northumbria and Hilda of Whitby.

== Background ==
Hereswith was the great-granddaughter of Ælle, King of Deira through her father Hereric, who was nephew of Edwin of Northumbria. Around 604 Æthelfrith, King of Bernicia took control of Deira. Æthelfrith married Edwin's sister, Acha of Deira; Edwin and Hereric went into exile.

Hereric was married to Beorhtswith/Breguswith and had two daughters, Hereswith and her younger sister Hild (born around 613). By 610 Edwin was at the court of Cearl of Mercia, where he married Cearl's daughter, Cwenburh and by her had two sons, Osfrith and Eadfrith. Hereric sought safety in the British kingdom of Elmet, then ruled by Ceretic. While at Elmet, Hereric died by poisoning, perhaps at the instigation of Æthelfrith. Suspicion fell on his host.

By around 616, Edwin had moved to the court of Rædwald of East Anglia. Multiple envoys from Æthelfrith offered bribes and then threats to try to persuade Rædwald to murder his guest or turn him over to them. Rædwald was inclined to do so until admonished by his pagan queen for acting in a manner dishonourable for a king by betraying a trust for fear or greed. Once Æthelfrith's ambassadors had gone, Rædwald resolved on war. Rædwald defeated Æthelfrith at the Battle of the River Idle. With Æthelfrith defeated, Rædwald installed Edwin as king of Northumbria.

== Northumbria ==
With Edwin now king in Northumbria, Hereric's family became attached to his household. Edwin and Eadbald of Kent were allies at this time, and Edwin arranged to marry Eadbald's sister Æthelburg. Bede notes that Eadbald would agree to marry his sister to Edwin only if he converted to Christianity. Edwin, a pagan, had encountered Christianity at Rædwald court. In 625, she married Edwin as his second wife.

Edwin and his household, including Breguswith and her daughters Hereswith and Hild, were baptised by Paulinus at York in the spring of 627. The family of Rædwald's brother Eni began to assume power in East Anglia during this time.

== East Anglia ==
It was almost certainly in this period, and probably at Edwin's behest, that Hereswith was married to a son of Eni named Æthilric. It is suggested (but not certain) that Æthilric was the same person as Ecgric of East Anglia, who ruled with Sigeberht of East Anglia during the early 630s, when Christianity was restored to East Anglia. This royal alliance suggests that Æthilric was expected to rule and was either already Christian, or had accepted the faith in consequence of the marriage. Edwin was slain by Cadwallon in about 632: Ecgric and Sigeberht died together fighting the pagan Mercian ruler Penda, probably in 636, and Ecgric succeeded by a Christian son of Eni named Anna, who ruled until about 654.

== Hereswith's son ==
Hereswith and Æthilric's son Ealdwulf was possibly born during the late 620s. Ealdwulf ruled East Anglia from 664 to 713, after two other sons of Eni, Æthelhere (reigned 654) and Æthelwold had ruled after Anna. Ealdwulf was therefore then seen as the legitimate heir of the Wuffingas household.

== Hereswith's departure for Chelles ==
During the 640s, Hereswith's sister Hild received teaching from Saint Aidan of Lindisfarne. About 647, she travelled to the court of Anna to join her sister Hereswith in East Anglia. However, Hereswith had already left to live a religious life and as there was then no nunnery in her kingdom she travelled to Gaul and (according to Bede) lived at Chelles Abbey, where there was a royal oratory. Hereswith remained in Gaul for the rest of her life.

== Confusions of identity ==
The identity of Hereswith's husband Æthilric is shown in the East Anglian dynastic tally known as the Anglian collection and in the list given in the Historia Brittonum, since Æthilric is in both cases shown as the father of Ealdwulf and Bede states that Hild was Ealdwulf's aunt. It is unlikely that other versions which make her the wife of Æthelhere or of Anna can be correct, since her departure for the religious life in Gaul preceded their deaths. Æthilric was probably dead by 647, prompting Hereswith's retirement, and Ecgric is the only other ruler with whom this son of Eni might be identified. The Anglian collection also lists Ælfwald of East Anglia as the son of Ealdwulf, and not of Athilric and Hereswith, as is sometimes stated.

After staying for one year in East Anglia in 647, Hild returned to Northumbria to rule the monastery of Hartlepool and later founded the royal Northumbrian abbey and mausoleum of Whitby, where Edwin was enshrined.

== Sources ==
- Bede, Historia Ecclesiastica Gentis Anglorum, Ed B. Colgrave and R. A. B. Mynors (Oxford 1969).
- S. J. Plunkett, Suffolk in Anglo-Saxon Times (Tempus, Stroud 2005).
- F. M. Stenton, "The East Anglian Kings of the Seventh Century", in P. Clemoes (ed.), The Anglo-Saxons (London, 1959), 43–52.
