= Wuffingas =

Anglo-Saxon royal dynasty of East Anglia

The kingdom of the East Angles during the period it was ruled by the Wuffingas, bordered by the North Sea, the River Stour, the Devil's Dyke and the Fens

The Wuffingas, Uffingas or Wiffings were the ruling dynasty of East Anglia, the long-lived Anglo-Saxon kingdom which today includes the English counties of Norfolk and Suffolk. The Wuffingas took their name from Wuffa, an early East Anglian king. Nothing is known of the members of the dynasty before Rædwald, who ruled from about 599 to c.624. The Viking invasions of the 9th century and Dissolution of the monasteries in the 16th century both led to the destruction of documents relating to the rule of the Wuffingas.

The last of the Wuffingas kings was Ælfwald, who died in 749; he was succeeded by kings whose lineage is unknown.

== Earliest kings of the East Angles ==
The Kingdom of East Anglia was founded by peoples migrating from northern Europe during the 5th and 6th centuries. Historical sources relating to the genealogy of the East Anglian kings include the Anglo-Saxon Chronicle and the 8th century English monk Bede's Ecclesiastical History, both compiled many years after the kingdom was formed, as well as a pedigree of Ælfwald contained in the Anglian collection that dates from the 9th century. In the pedigree, Ælfwald is claimed to descend from the god Wōden.

The earliest kings of East Anglia were known as the Wuffingas, named after the semi-historical founder of the dynasty, Wuffa. Rædwald (died c. 625) is the first of the country's kings known to have ruled. Bede identified Rædwald's father as Tytil and his grandfather as Wuffa; their respective accession dates of 571 and 578 were given by the 13th century English chronicler Roger of Wendover. The Historia Brittonum lists Wehha, father of Wuffa as the first of the Wuffingas, which perhaps sets the date for the origins of the dynasty to the middle of the 6th century.

Wuffa is thought to mean "little wolf", suggesting that the dynastic name Wuffingas translates as "kin of the wolf", making it etymologically the same as the Wulfings clan named in Beowulf and the Old English poem "Widsith".

The parallels between the Sutton Hoo burials, which are thought to commemorate a Wuffingas king, and the Swedish burials at Vendel has led some historians, such as Rupert Bruce-Mitford to put forward a Scandinavian origin for the Wuffingas dynasty, although others regard this as unproven.

== Dynasty ==
The following family tree includes the Wuffingas kings from Wehha to Ælfwald. They are numbered in order of ruling. Ecgric was also a member of the Wuffingas house, but his exact descent is not decided. He may have been Sigeberht's brother, or his step-brother.

Wuffingas Family Tree

Wehha^{1}
Wuffa^{2}
Tytila^{3}
?	Rædwald^{4}	?	Eni	?
Eorpwald^{5}	Rægenhere	Sigeberht^{6}	Anna^{7}	Saewara	Æthelhere^{8}	Æthelwold^{9}	Æthelric	Hereswitha
Seaxburh	Æthelthryth	Æthelburh	Jurmin	Ealdwulf^{10}
Ælfwald^{11}

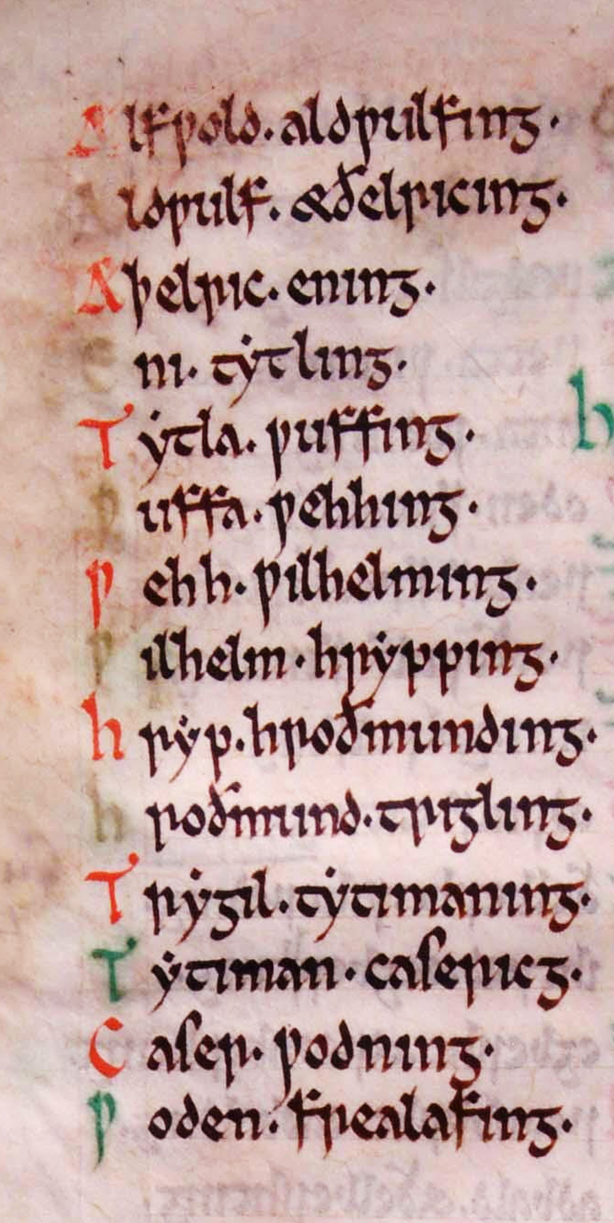
Ancestor
Ælfwald (Alfwold Aldwulfing)
Ealdwulf (Aldwulf Æðelricing)
Ethelric (Æþelric Ening)
Eni (Eni Tytling)
Tytla (Tytla Wuffing)
Wuffa (Wuffa Wehhing)
Wehha (Wehh Wilhelming)
Wilhelm (Wilhelm Hrypping)
Hryth (Hryp Hroðmunding)
Hrothmund (Hroðmund Trigling)
Trygil (Trygil Tytimaning)
Tytiman (Tytiman Casericg)
Caesar (Caser Wodning)
Wōden (Woden Frealafing)
Pedigree of Ælfwald from the Anglian collection,
preserved in the Textus Roffensis

After 749, East Anglia was ruled either by the rulers of Mercia, or by kings whose genealogy is not known.

== Centres of royal power ==
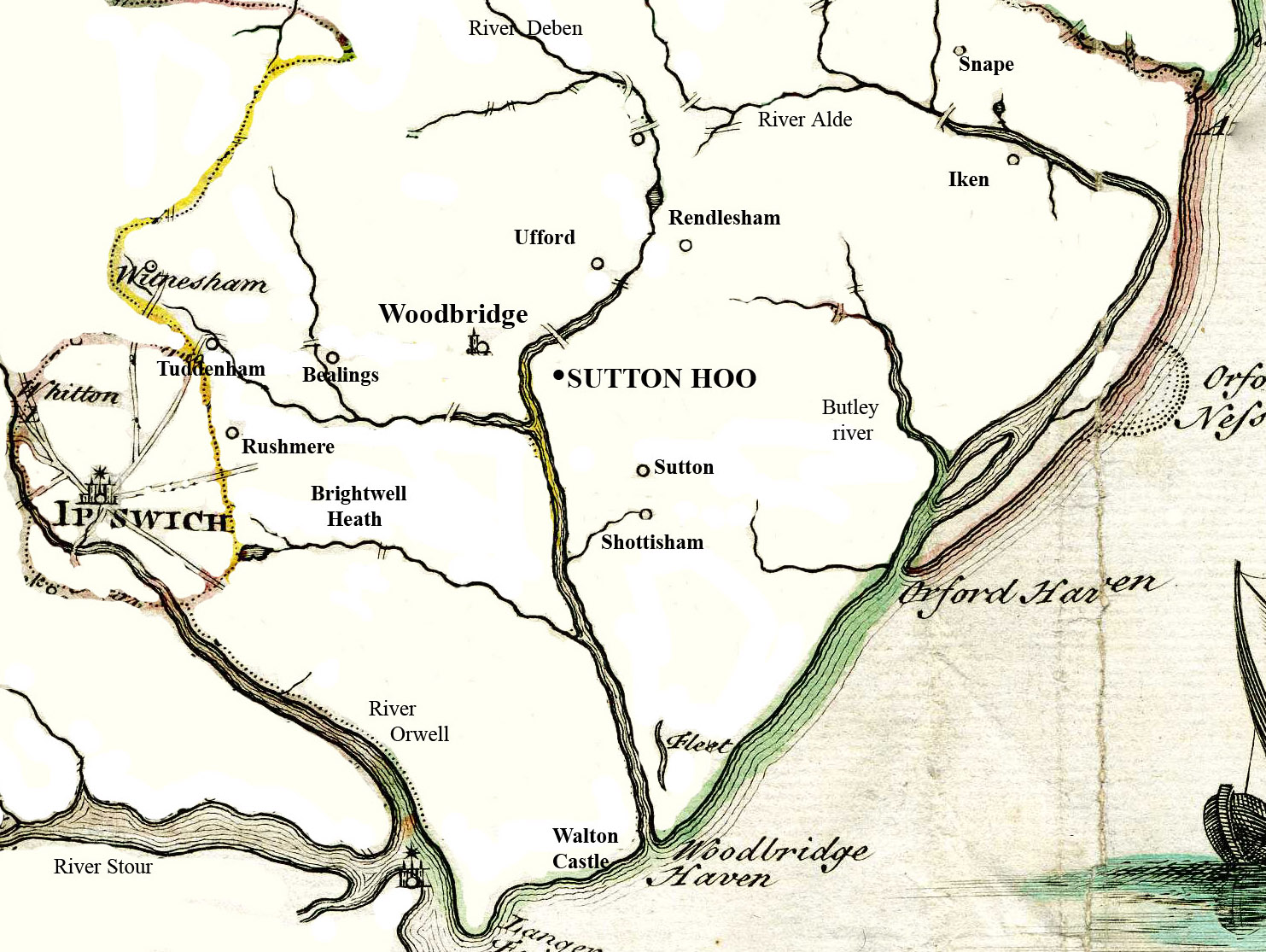
The Wicklaw region

Sutton Hoo, the site of two early medieval cemeteries dating from the 6th to 7th centuries, lies along a bank of the tidal estuary of the River Deben. It stands 7 miles (11 km) from the North Sea and below the lowest convenient fording place. It formed a path of entry into East Anglia during the period that followed the end of Roman imperial rule in the 5th century.

The territory between the Orwell and the watersheds of the Alde and Deben rivers may have been an early centre of royal power for the Wuffingas kings, originally centred upon Rendlesham or Sutton Hoo, and a primary component in the formation of the East Anglian kingdom. In the early 7th century, Gipeswic (modern Ipswich) began its growth as a centre for foreign trade, Botolph's monastery at Iken was founded by royal grant in 654, and Bede identified Rendlesham as the site of Æthelwold's royal dwelling.

== Cultural associations ==
The author Sam Newton has claimed that the Old English epic poem Beowulf may have been composed during the reign of Ælfwald. Before the end of his rule, East Anglia contained a group of ecclesiastical centres, all of which had strong associations with the Wuffingas dynasty. These included the sees at Dommoc and Helmham, Botwulf of Thorney's monastery at Icanho, the religious foundations at Ely and Dereham founded by daughters of Anna, the minster at Blythburgh and the monastery founded by Sigeberht prior to his abdication and subsequent death in battle.

A 1997 play, The Wuffings, was performed by the Eastern Angles Theatre Company on a sandy beach near Sutton Hoo. The play, by Kevin Crossley-Holland and Eastern Angles co-founder and artistic director Ivan Cutting, reimagines Rædwald and his family as "soap opera meets historical pageant."

== Bibliography ==
- Bruce-Mitford, Rupert (1974). Aspects of Anglo-Saxon Archaeology: Sutton Hoo and Other Discoveries. London: Victor Gollancz Limited. ISBN 978-0-575-01704-7.
- Newton, Sam (2004). The Origins of Beowulf and the Pre-Viking Kingdom of East Anglia. Cambridge: D. S. Brewer. ISBN 978-0-85991-472-7.
- Wade, Keith (2001). "Gipeswic – East Anglia's first economic capital, 600–1066". In Salmon, Neil & Malster, Robert (eds.). Ipswich from the First to the Third Millennium: Papers from an Ipswich Society Symposium. Ipswich: Ipswich Society. pp. 1–6. ISBN 978-0-9507328-1-7.
- West, Stanley E.; Scarfe, Norman & Cramp, Rosemary (1984). "Iken, St Botolph, and the Coming of East Anglian Christianity" (PDF). Proceedings of the Suffolk Institute of Archaeology. XXXV (4). Ipswich: Society of Antiquaries of London: 279–301.
- West, Stanley E. (1998). Aspects of Anglo-Saxon Archaeology: Sutton Hoo and Other Discoveries (PDF). East Anglian Archaeology (Report). Ipswich: Suffolk County Council. ISBN 978-0-86055-246-8.
- Yorke, Barbara (2002). Kings and Kingdoms of Early Anglo-Saxon England. London and New York: Routledge. ISBN 978-0-415-16639-3.
