= List of monarchs of East Anglia =

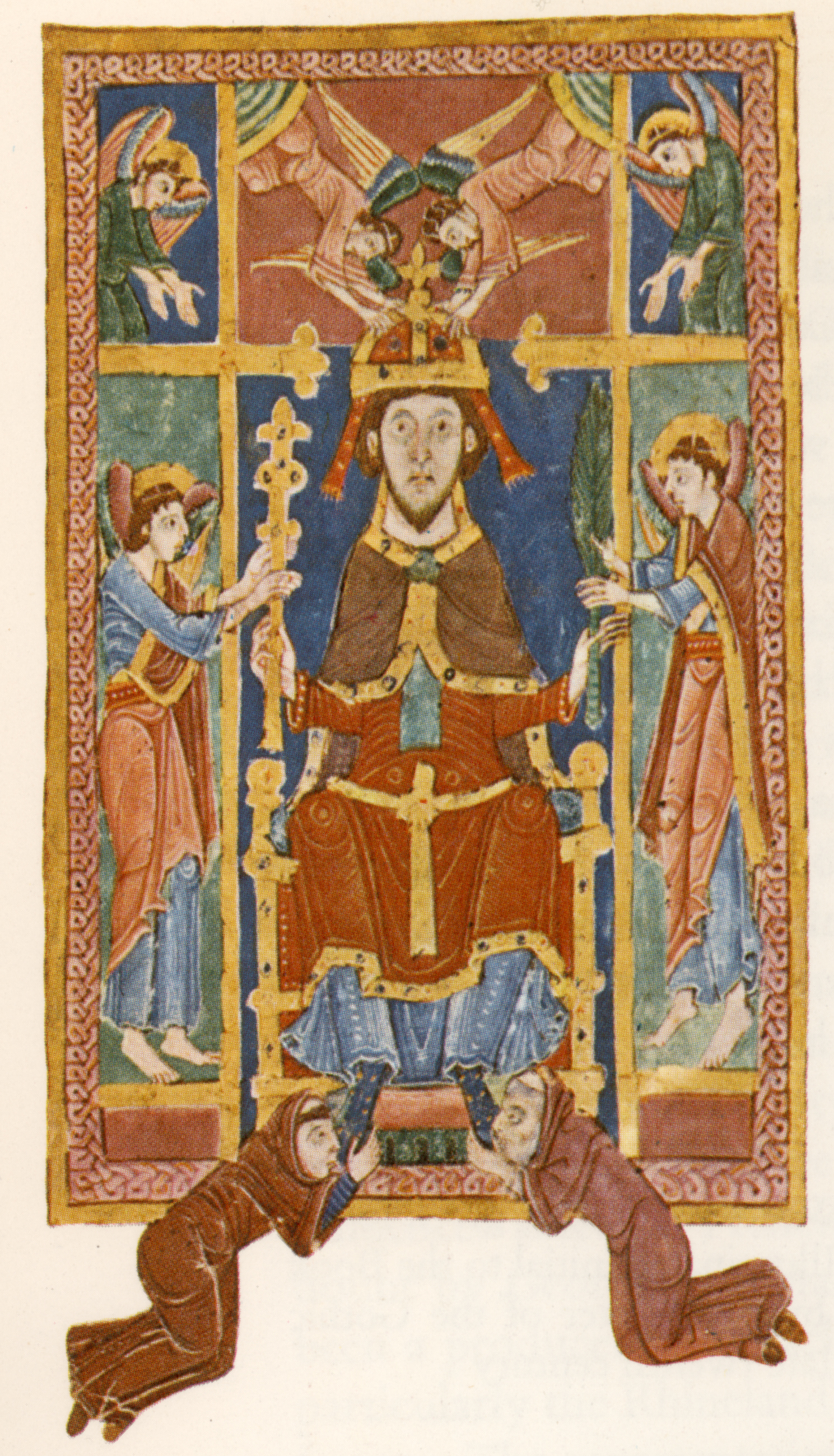
Edmund, king of the East Angles, who was killed during the invasion of his kingdom by the Great Heathen Army

The Kingdom of East Anglia, also known as the Kingdom of the East Angles, was a small independent Anglo-Saxon kingdom that comprised what are now the English counties of Norfolk and Suffolk and perhaps the eastern part of The Fens. The kingdom was one of the seven traditional members of the Anglo-Saxon Heptarchy. The East Angles were initially ruled (from the 6th century until 749) by members of the Wuffingas dynasty, named after Wuffa, whose name means 'descendants of the wolf'. The last king was Guthrum II, who ruled in the 10th century. After 749 East Anglia was ruled by kings whose genealogy is not known, or by underkings who were subject to the control of the kings of Mercia. East Anglia briefly recovered its independence after the death of Offa of Mercia in 796, but Mercian hegemony was soon restored by his successor, Coenwulf. Between 826 and 869, following an East Anglian revolt in which the Mercian king, Beornwulf, was killed, the East Angles again regained their independence. In 869 a Danish army defeated and killed the last native East Anglian king, Edmund the Martyr. The kingdom then fell into the hands of the Danes and eventually formed part of the Danelaw. In 918 the East Anglian Danes accepted the overlordship of Edward the Elder of Wessex. East Anglia then became part of the Anglo-Saxon kingdom of England.

Many of the regnal dates of the East Anglian kings are considered unreliable, often being based upon computations. Some dates have presented particular problems for scholars: for instance, during the three-year-long period of apostasy that followed the murder of Eorpwald, when it is not known whether any king ruled the East Angles. The main source of information about the early history of the kingdom's rulers is Bede's Ecclesiastical History of the English People.

== Chronological list ==
Timeline	Dynasty	Reign	King	Notes
	Wuffingas	d. 571	Wehha	Possible ruler; "The first to rule over the East Angles", according to Nennius. Died in 571.
	Wuffingas	571–578 (from unknown annal).	Wuffa	Possible ruler; son of Wehha and the king after whom the Wuffingas dynasty is named.
	Wuffingas	578 (from unknown annal).	Tytila	Possible ruler; son of 'Uffa' (Wuffa); acceded in 578, according to the Flores Historiarum.
	Wuffingas	Acceded around 616, died before 627.	Rædwald	Son of Tytila; named imperium by Bede, later interpreted as Bretwalda. The Flores Historiarum gives 599 for Rædwald's accession. Rædwald is the first of the Wuffingas of which more than a name is known.
	Wuffingas	Died 627 or 628.	Eorpwald	Son of Rædwald; murdered by Ricberht.
	Wuffingas	c. 627 to c. 630.	Ricberht	Possible ruler.
	Wuffingas	Acceded c. 630.	Sigeberht	Possible son of Rædwald. Abdicated to lead a monastic life; later slain in battle in 637.
	Wuffingas	Acceded c. 630 (ruled jointly with Sigeberht until c. 634).	Ecgric	Slain in battle, possibly as late as 641; kinsman or brother of Sigeberht. Possible son of Rædwald.
	Wuffingas	early 640s to c. 653.	Anna	Nephew of Rædwald and son of Eni; killed, according to the Anglo-Saxon Chronicle.
	Wuffingas	c. 653 to 655.	Æthelhere	Brother of Anna. Slain at the Battle of the Winwaed.
	Wuffingas	655 to 663.	Æthelwold	Brother of Anna.
	Wuffingas	663 to 713.	Ealdwulf	Nephew of Anna, Æthelhere and Æthelwold.
	Wuffingas	713 to 749	Ælfwald	Son of Ealdwulf.
	East Anglian dynasty	Ruling in 749.	Beonna, Alberht and possibly Hun	Joint kings, of unknown origin Alberht is also known as Æthelberht I. Nothing is known of Hun.
	East Anglian dynasty	Unknown.	Æthelred I	Possibly succeeded Beonna; sub-king named as the father of Æthelberht II.
	East Anglian dynasty	?779 to 794.	Æthelberht II	Accession date is from a late mediaeval source; East Anglian independence indicated by ability of Æthelberht to mint his own coins. Executed at the command of Offa.
	Mercian dynasty	794 to c. 796	Offa	Ruled Mercia from 757 to July 796; jointly ruled with his son Ecgfrith from 787 (who succeeded him and died after ruling for less than five months). Held dominion over the East Angles.
	East Anglian dynasty	c. 796 to c. 800.	Eadwald	Ancestry unknown; emerged as king during a period of instability following the death of Offa.
	Mercian dynasty	c. 800 to 821	Coenwulf	Ruled Mercia from 796 to 821: held dominion over the East Angles after Eadwald's brief reign; no precise date is known for the start of his overlordship in East Anglia.
	Mercian dynasty	821 to 823	Ceolwulf	Brother of Coenwulf; ruled Mercia from 821 to 823.
	Mercian dynasty	823 to 827	Beornwulf	Of unknown origin; Ruled Mercia from 823. to 826; killed during an East Anglian revolt.
	East Anglian Dynasty	827 to 845.	Æthelstan	Probably led a revolt against the Mercians in 825. East Anglian independence re-established at his accession.
	East Anglian Dynasty	c.845 to 855.	Æthelweard	
	East Anglian Dynasty	855 to 869.	Edmund (Eadmund)	Son of Æthelweard. The last native East Anglian king; acceded at the age of 14 (according to Asser); killed by the Vikings 20 November 869; canonised. Political organisation of East Anglia following the death of Edmund is uncertain.
	Kings under Norse suzerainty	c. 869 to 875.	Oswald	Underking, known only from numismatic evidence.
	Kings under Norse suzerainty	c. 875 to 878.	Æthelred II	Underking, known only from numismatic evidence.
	Danish kingdom of East Anglia	c. 878 to 890.	Guthrum	East Anglia was awarded to him in 878 as part of the Treaty of Wedmore with Alfred the Great of Wessex. Died in 890 at the age of 55.
	Danish kingdom of East Anglia	890 to 902.	Eohric	Killed in battle (along with Æthelwold) in December 902.
	Danish kingdom of East Anglia	902	Æthelwold	Underking of the Danes; killed in battle in December 902.
	Danish kingdom of East Anglia	902 to 918.	Guthrum II	East Anglian Danes accepted Edward the Elder's overlordship; killed in battle in 918.

== See also ==
- Lists of monarchs in the British Isles
- List of legendary kings of Britain
