= Tytila of East Anglia =

Tytila
- 'Tytla Wuffing' from the Textus Roffensis

King of the East Angles
- Reign: possibly from about 578 to about 616.
- Predecessor: Wuffa
- Successor: Rædwald
- Religion: Anglo-Saxon Paganism

Tytila (died around 616) was a semi-historical pagan king of East Anglia, a small Anglo-Saxon kingdom which today includes the English counties of Norfolk and Suffolk. Early sources, including Bede's Ecclesiastical History of the English People, identify him as an early member of the Wuffingas dynasty who succeeded his father Wuffa. A later chronicle dates his reign from 578, but he is not known to have definitely ruled as king and nothing of his life is known. He is listed in a number of genealogical lists.

A number of later mediaeval sources recorded that in about 616, Tytila was succeeded by his son Rædwald.

== The Wuffingas dynasty ==
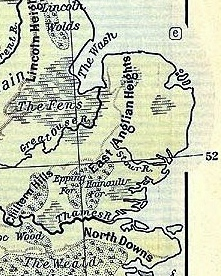
A physical map of Eastern England

The peoples known to us as the Angles, Saxons, Jutes and Frisians, began to arrive in Britain in the 5th century. By 600, a number of kingdoms had begun to form in southern and eastern Britain, and by the beginning of the seventh century, southern England was almost entirely under their control. Tytila was a member of the Wuffingas family, the ruling dynasty of the Kingdom of the East Angles that was named after his father Wuffa. The Wuffingas may have been descendants of an earlier Scandinavian dynasty. Both he and his father are semi-historical figures.

The Victorian ethnologist John Beddoe noted the similarity between the name Tytila and that of Totila, an Ostrogoth king.

Tytila is included in a number of different tallies. In the Ecclesiastical History of the English People, which was completed in Northumbria by Bede in 731, Tytila is named as the father of Rædwald and the son of Wuffa: 'Erat autem praefatus rex Reduald natu nobilis, quamlibet actu ignobilis, filius Tytili, cuius pater fuit Uuffa...' . The 9th century Welsh monk Nennius, in his Historia Brittonum, also lists Tytila, naming him as the father of Eni of East Anglia: '...Uffa, who begat Tytillus, who begat Eni,...' whilst relating the origin of the kings of East Anglia. Tytila is included in an East Anglian royal tally that lists the ancestors of Ælfwald and that names many, but not all, of the early East Anglian kings. The tally, which forms part of the Anglian collection, comes from the 12th century Textus Roffensis.

== Reign ==
Nothing is known of Tytila's life or his rule, as no written records have survived from this period in East Anglian history. The mediaeval chronicler Roger of Wendover dated Tytila's reign from 578, but his source of information is unknown and the accession date may have been a guess on the part of the chronicler. Tytila's son and successor, Rædwald, the greatest of the Wuffingas monarchs, is the first East Anglian king who is more than a semi-historical figure, although much information about him, including the year of his death, is conjectural. The finds from the excavations of the two separate cemeteries at Sutton Hoo in Suffolk and at other sites in East Anglia point to close connections at this time between south-eastern Britain, the Frankish Rhinelands, the Eastern Mediterranean and of growing royal prestige and authority, reflected by the magnificent grave-goods discovered in the main burial-ship at Sutton Hoo. The grave goods at Sutton Hoo also point to close ties with Sweden. Names of family members also share similarity with names in Sweden at the same time. Plates on helmets found at the Valsgärde ship burial are so close to the ones from Sutton Hoo that it has been theorized that they were made by the same craftsman or a close associate or apprentice. The poem Beowulf from a few centuries later also lends validity to a close connection between the East Angles and their Southern Swedish cousins.

The date that Tytila died is unknown, but he is thought to have been succeeded by his son Rædwald in about 616.

The descendants of Tytila's ancestor Wehha

Wehha
Wuffa
Tytila
Rædwald	Eni

See Wuffingas for a more complete family tree.

== See also ==
- Anglo-Saxon royal genealogies

== Sources ==
- Bede. "Bede's Ecclesiastical History of the English Nation (1870)".
- Beddoe, John (1983) [1862]. The Races of Britain: a Contribution to the Anthropology of Western Europe. London: Trübner and Co.
- Lapidge, M.; et al., eds. (1999). "Kings of the East Angles". The Blackwell Encyclopedia of Anglo-Saxon England. London: Blackwell. pp. 508–509. ISBN 0-631-22492-0.
- Medway Council CityArk. "A detailed reference to the Textus Roffensis, with links to images of each page in the manuscript".
- Nennius (2010). History of the Britons. Milton Keynes: Lightning Source UK Ltd. ISBN 978-1-60597-909-0.
- Plunkett, Steven (2005). Suffolk in Anglo-Saxon Times. Stroud: Tempus. ISBN 0-7524-3139-0.
- Warner, Peter (1996). The Origins of Suffolk. Manchester and New York: Manchester University Press. ISBN 0-7190-3817-0.
- Yorke, Barbara (2002). Kings and Kingdoms of Early Anglo-Saxon English. London and New York: Routledge. ISBN 0-415-16639-X.

English royalty
Preceded by Wuffa	King of East Anglia possibly from about 578 to about 616	Succeeded by Raedwald
