= Wehha of East Anglia =

Wehha
- 'Wehh Wilhelming' from the Textus Roffensis

King of the East Angles
- Reign: unknown
- Successor: Wuffa of East Anglia
- Died: c. 571
- Dynasty: Wuffingas
- Religion: Anglo-Saxon Paganism

Wehha of East Anglia is listed by Anglo-Saxon records as a king of the East Angles. If he existed, Wehha ruled the East Angles as a pagan king during the 6th century, when the region was being established as a kingdom by migrants arriving from what is now Frisia and the southern Jutland peninsula. Early sources identify him as a member of the Wuffingas dynasty, which was established around the east coast of Suffolk. Nothing of his reign is known.

According to the East Anglian tally from the Textus Roffensis, Wehha was the son of Wilhelm. The 9th century History of the Britons lists Wehha, named as 'Guillem Guercha', as the first king of the East Angles, as well as his son and heir Wuffa, after whom the dynasty was named. It has been claimed that the name Wehha is a hypocoristic version of Wihstān, from the Anglo-Saxon poem Beowulf. This claim, along with evidence from finds discovered at Sutton Hoo since 1939, suggests a connection between the Wuffingas and a Swedish dynasty, the Scylfings.

== Background ==
A topographical map of the kingdom of the East Angles

Wehha is thought to have been the earliest ruler of East Anglia, an independent and long-lived Anglo-Saxon kingdom established in the 6th century, which includes the modern English counties of Norfolk and Suffolk.

According to the historian R. Rainbird Clarke, migrants from southern Jutland "speedily dominated" the Sandlings, an area of southeast Suffolk, and then, by around 550, "lost no time in conquering the whole of East Anglia". Rainbird Clarke identified Wehha, the founder of the dynasty, as one of the leaders of the new arrivals: the East Angles are tentatively identified with the Geats of the Old English poem Beowulf. Rainbird Clarke used the evidence of the finds at Sutton Hoo to conclude that the Wuffingas originated from Sweden, noting that the sword, helmet and shield found in the ship burial at Sutton Hoo may have been family heirlooms, brought across from Sweden in the beginning of the 6th century. As it is now thought these artefacts were made in England, there is less agreement that the Wuffingas dynasty was directly linked with Sweden.

The extent of the kingdom of the East Angles can be determined from a variety of sources. It was isolated to the north and east by the North Sea, with impenetrable forests to the south and the swamps and scattered islands of the Fens on its western border. The main land route from East Anglia would at that time have been a land corridor, following the prehistoric Icknield Way. The southern neighbours of the East Angles were the East Saxons and across the other side of the Fens were the Middle Angles. It has been suggested that the Devil's Dyke (near modern Newmarket) formed part of the kingdom's western boundary, but its construction, which dates from between the 4th and 10th centuries, may not be of Early Anglo-Saxon origin.

== Genealogy ==
Wehha is a semi-historical figure and no evidence has survived to show he actually existed or was ever king of the East Angles. The name Wehha is included in tallies of the ruling Wuffingas dynasty: it appears as Ƿehh Ƿilhelming—Wehha Wilhelming—in the East Anglian tally from the Textus Roffensis, an important collection of Anglo-Saxon laws and Rochester Cathedral registers. The so-called Anglian collection has survived within two books bound together in the 13th century. According to this list, Wehha was the son of Wilhelm, who was the son of Hryþ, who was the son of Hroðmund, the son of Trygil, the son of Tyttman, the son of Casere Odisson, the son of the god Wōden. Wehha's son Wuffa, after whom the Wuffingas dynasty is named, is also listed.

According to the 9th century History of the Britons, Guillem Guercha was the first of his line to rule the East Angles. The History of the Britons lists Guercha's descendants and ancestors: "Woden begat Casser, who begat Titinon, who begat Trigil, who begat Rodmunt, who begat Rippa, who begat Guillem Guercha, who was the first king of the East Angles." According to the 19th-century historian Francis Palgrave, Guercha is a distortion of Wuffa. According to Palgrave, "Guercha is a form of the name Uffa, or Wuffa, arising in the first instance, from the pronunciation of the British writer, and in the next place, from the error of the transcriber". D. P. Kirby is among those historians who have concluded from this information that Wuffa's father was the founder of the Wuffingas line.

Despite the Wuffingas' long list of ancestors—that stretch back to their pagan gods—their power in the region can only have been established in the middle third of the 6th century, if Wehha is taken as the dynastic founder. The historian Martin Carver has warned against using the scant material that exists to draw detailed inferences about the earliest Wuffingas kings.

The descendants of Wehha

Wehha
Wuffa
Tytila
Rædwald	Eni

See Wuffingas for a more complete family tree.

== Etymology ==
The name Wehha has been linked as a hypocoristic (shortened) version of Wihstān, the father of Wiglaf in Beowulf, strengthening the evidence for a connection between the Wuffingas dynasty and a Swedish royal dynasty, the Scylfings. It has also been suggested that Wehha is a regular hypocoristic form of Old English names beginning with Wē(o)h-, for instance in the unattested name *Weohha.

Wehha may occur on a bronze pail excavated from the Chessell Down cemetery on the Isle of Wight, which possesses the runic inscription wecca.

== Reign and succession ==
Nothing is known of Wehha or of his rule, as no written records—if they ever existed—have survived from this period in East Anglian history. At an unknown date Wehha was succeeded by Wuffa, who was ruling the kingdom in 571, according to the mediaeval chronicler Roger of Wendover, however Wendover's dates themselves cannot be corroborated.

== Sources ==
- Carver, M. O. H. (1992). The Age of Sutton Hoo: the Seventh Century in North-Western Europe. Woodbridge: Boydell Press. ISBN 978-0-85115-330-8.
- Collingwood, R.G.; Myres, John Nowell Linton (1949). Roman Britain And The English Settlements (2nd ed.). Oxford: Clarenden Press. OCLC 247552427.
- Giles, John Allen (1848). Six Old English Chronicles. London: H.G. Bohn. OCLC 1084819059.
- Hoops, Johannes (2003). "Rædwald". Reallexikon der germanischen Altertumskunde (in English and German). Vol. 24. Walter de Gruyter. p. 66. ISBN 978-3-11-017575-2.
- Kirby, D.P. (2000). The Earliest English Kings. London and New York: Routledge. ISBN 978-0-415-24211-0.
- Looijenga, Tineke (2003). Texts & Contexts of the Oldest Runic Inscriptions. Leiden: Koninklijke Brill NV. ISBN 978-90-04-12396-0.
- Newton, Sam (1993). The Origins of Beowulf and the Pre-Viking Kingdom of East Anglia. Cambridge: D. S. Brewer. ISBN 978-0-85991-472-7.
- Palgrave, Sir Francis (1832). The Rise and Progress of the English Commonwealth: Anglo-Saxon Period. Vol. 1. London: John Murray.
- Plunkett, Steven (2005). Suffolk in Anglo-Saxon Times. Stroud: Tempus. ISBN 978-0-7524-3139-0.
- Rainbird Clarke, R. (1963). East Anglia. London: Thames and Hudson.
- Yorke, Barbara (2002). Kings and Kingdoms of Early Anglo-Saxon England. London and New York: Routledge. ISBN 978-0-415-16639-3.

English royalty
Preceded by unknown	King of East Anglia unknown regnal dates	Succeeded by Wuffa
