= Edward Joseph Kylie =

Canadian historian and Army officer

Edward Joseph Kylie (19 September 1880 – 14 May 1916) was a Canadian historian and Army officer.

== Biography ==
Born in Lindsay, Ontario, Kylie was the only son of Richard Kylie, a blacksmith. He was educated at home, then at a school run by the Sisters of Loreto, at Lindsay Collegiate Institute, and at University College, University of Toronto. A protégé of George MacKinnon Wrong, head of the Department of History at the University of Toronto, Kylie then proceeded to Balliol College, Oxford, where he took first-class honours in modern history in 1904.

Returning to Canada, Kylie was appointed to the Department of History at the University of Toronto in 1904 at Wrong's instigation, being promoted to associate professor in 1912. His scholarly work focused on medieval English history and 19th century Canadian history. In parallel, Kylie took an increasingly prominent part in public debates. A committed imperialist, he joined the Round Table movement, becoming the secretary of the Canadian branch.

At the outbreak of the First World War, Kylie took an enthusiastic part in war work at the University of Toronto, before joining the 147th (Grey) Battalion, CEF, commanded by his friend George Franklin McFarland, as adjutant, with the rank of captain. After being inoculated for typhoid in May 1916, he developed pleurisy and lung congestion and died the same month, despite efforts to save him.
