= Wuffa of East Anglia =

Wuffa
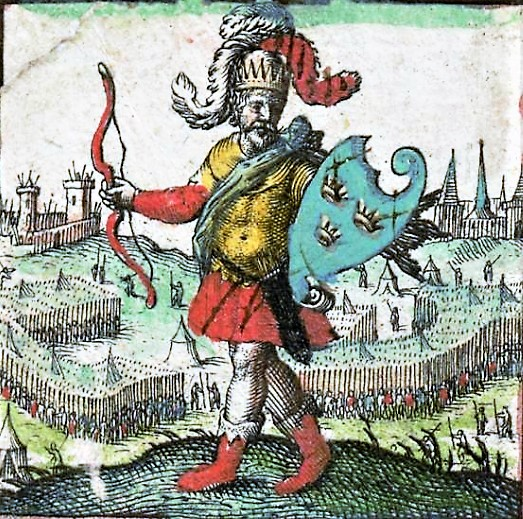
- An imaginary depiction of Wuffa, from John Speed's Saxon Heptarchy (1611)

King of the East Angles
- Reign: c.571-c.578
- Predecessor: Wehha
- Successor: Tytila
- House: Wuffingas
- Father: Wehha
- Religion: Anglo-Saxon Paganism

Wuffa (or Uffa, Old English: Ƿuffa) is recorded in the Anglo-Saxon genealogies as an early king of East Anglia. If historical, he would have lived in the 6th century.

By tradition Wuffa was named as the son of Wehha and the father of Tytila, but it is not known with any certainty that Wuffa was an actual historical figure. The name Wuffa was the eponym for the Wuffingas dynasty, the ruling royal family of the East Angles until 749.

Bede regarded Wuffa as the first king of the East Angles, but the author of the Historia Brittonum, writing a century later, named Wehha as the first ruler.

== Background ==
A topographical map of the kingdom of the East Angles

The kingdom of the East Angles was an independent and long-lived Anglo-Saxon kingdom that was established after migrants arrived in southeast Suffolk from the area now known as Jutland. Rainbird Clarke identified Wehha as one of the leaders of the new arrivals: the East Angles are tentatively identified with the Geats of the Old English poem Beowulf. Historians have used sources such as the Anglian collection too as an aid in calculating a date for the establishment of the kingdom. Collingwood and Myers note the use of literacy sources and archaeological finds as evidence of how the region was settled during and after the 5th century, when various disparate groups arrived in Norfolk and Suffolk from different parts of the coast and the rivers of the Fens.

The kingdom of the East Angles was bordered to the north and east by the North Sea, to the south by mainly impenetrable forests and by the Fens marshes on its western border. The main land route from East Anglia would at that time have been a corridor, along which ran the prehistoric Icknield Way. The Devil's Dyke (near modern Newmarket) may have at one time formed part of the kingdom's western boundary, but its construction cannot be dated accurately enough to establish it as of Anglo-Saxon origin.

== Pedigree and reign ==
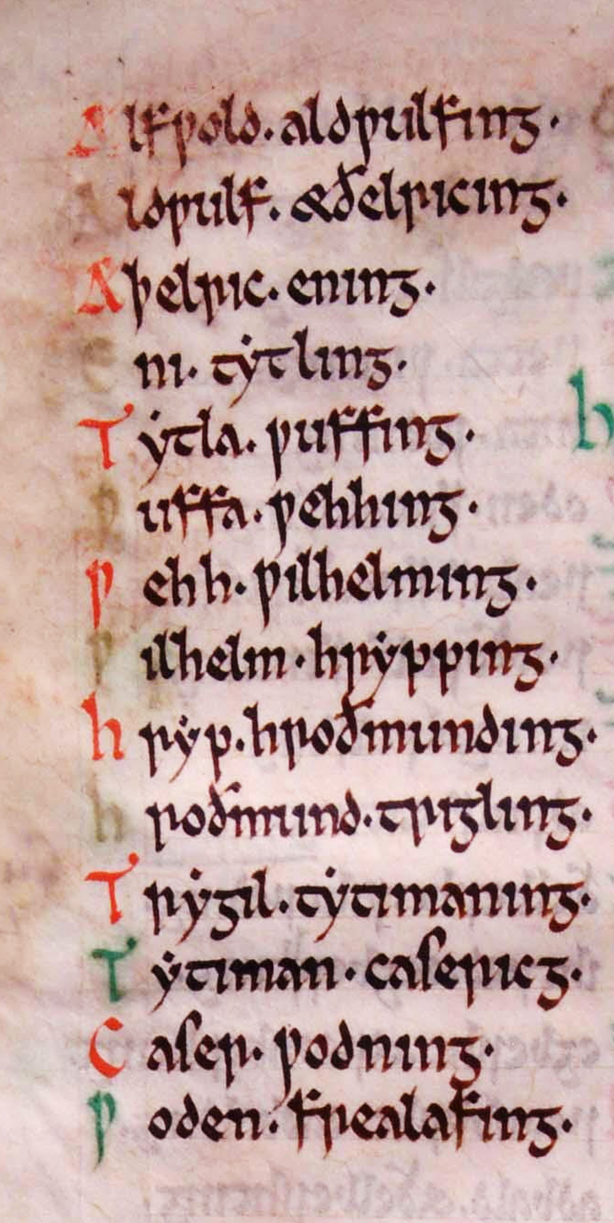
'Wuffa Wehhing', as recorded in the Textus Roffensis

According to the East Anglian dynastic tally in the Anglian collection, Wuffa was the son of Wehha and the father of Tytila. His name, which is a diminutive form of the Old English word for wolf, is the eponym for his dynasty, the Wuffingas, (which taken literally, means 'the kin of Wuffa'). It has been suggested that Wuffa and his dynasty may possibly have originated from a Germanic tribe known as the Warni: Wuffa has been identified with the 'King of the Angli', as depicted by the Byzantine scholar Procopius. According to Procopius, a 6th-century Warni prince called Radigis was betrothed to the sister of the 'King of the Angli'. The historian Michael Wood has suggested that before the arrival of Wuffa's dynasty in Britain, it had been founded by "some powerful and important warrior" that was of an ancient royal line.

According to the 13th-century chronicler Roger of Wendover, Wuffa ruled from 571 to 578, but the origin of this information is unknown. According to Michael Wood, current evidence suggests that Wuffa ruled the East Angles around 575.

Bede named Wuffa as the grandfather of Rædwald, "from whom the East Anglian kings are called Wuffingas", but Bede's view that Wuffa was the first King of the East Angles is contradicted by the 9th-century Historia Brittonum, which instead apparently names a person called Guillem Guercha. In the Historia Brittonum, Guillem Guercha is listed as part of a long pedigree:

Woden begat Casser, who begat Titinon, who begat Trigil, who begat Rodmunt, who begat Rippa, who begat Guillem Guercha, who was the first king of the East Angles. Guercha begat Uffa, who begat Tytillus, who begat Eni, who begat Edric, who begat Aldwulf, who begat Elric.

The 19th-century historian Sir Francis Palgrave confused matters when he stated that "Guercha is a distortion of the name Uffa, or Wuffa, arising in the first instance from the pronunciation of the British writer, and in the next place from the error of the transcriber". D. P. Kirby has however concluded that Nennius intended to mean that it was Wehha, and not Wuffa, who was the earliest Wuffingas king.

A lack of documentary evidence prevents scholars from knowing if Wuffa is anything more than a legendary figure and the true identity of the first East Anglian king cannot be known with certainty. The historian Martin Carver has argued that Wuffa is "best regarded as an emblematic figure personified from royal origin-myth". It is believed that Wuffa founded the Suffolk village of Ufford, which is commonly translated as "Uffa's Ford".

Later East Anglian kings claimed their right to rule by being descended from Wuffa, in the same way that the Kentish kings claimed descent from Oisc.

The descendants of Wehha

Wehha
Wuffa
Tytila
Rædwald | Eni

See Wuffingas for a more complete family tree.

== Sources ==
- Bredehoft, Thomas A. (2001). Textual Histories: Readings in the Anglo-Saxon Chronicle. Toronto, Buffalo, London: University of Toronto Press. ISBN 978-0-8020-4850-9.
- Carver, M. O. H., ed. (1992). The Age of Sutton Hoo: The Seventh Century in North-Western Europe. Woodbridge: Boydell Press. ISBN 978-0-85115-330-8.
- Collingwood, R. G.; Myers, J. N. L. (1936). Roman Britain and the English Settlements. New York: Biblo and Tannen. ISBN 978-0-8196-1160-4.
- Fryde, E. B.; Greenway, D. E.; Porter, S.; Roy, I. (1986). Handbook of British Chronology (3rd ed.). Cambridge: Cambridge University Press. ISBN 978-0-521-56350-5.
- Giles, J. A. (1849). Roger of Wendover's Flowers of History. London: Bohn.
- Kirby, D.P. (2000). The Earliest English Kings. London and New York: Routledge. ISBN 978-0-415-24211-0.
- Nennius. History of the Britons (Historia Brittonum). Project Gutenberg.
- Palgrave, Sir Francis (1832). The Rise and Progress of the English Commonwealth: Anglo-Saxon Period. Vol. 1. London: John Murray.
- Plunkett, Steven (2005). Suffolk in Anglo-Saxon Times. Stroud: Tempus. ISBN 978-0-7524-3139-0.
- Rainbird Clarke, Roy (1960). East Anglia. London: Readers Union Ltd. OCLC 185788340.
- Warner, Peter (1996). The Origins of Suffolk. Manchester and New York: Manchester University Press. ISBN 978-0-7190-3817-4.
- Wood, Michael (2005). In Search of the Dark Ages. London: BBC Books. ISBN 978-0-563-52276-8.
- Yorke, Barbara (2002). Kings and Kingdoms of Early Anglo-Saxon England. London and New York: Routledge. ISBN 978-0-415-16639-3.

English royalty
| Preceded by Wehha | King of East Anglia | Succeeded by Tytila |
