= Egburg =

9th century English abbess

Egburg (also Egburga, Ecburg) was a 9th-century abbess about whom little is known. A letter by her remains in the Boniface correspondence, in which she writes to Saint Boniface of her grief. The letter evidences that she was highly learned—according to Eleanor Duckett, "Her letter is short, and her misery is very great; she manages, however, to bring in four reminiscences of Vergil's Aeneid, two of various writings of Aldhelm of Malmesbury ..., two of a letter written by Jerome to the monk Rufinus, together with at least half a dozen quotations from the Bible". Lina Eckenstein proposes she might have been a daughter of Ealdwulf, king of East Anglia, and the abbess of Repton.
