= Rædwald of East Anglia =

King of East Anglia (ruled c. 599–624)

Rædwald
- Bretwalda
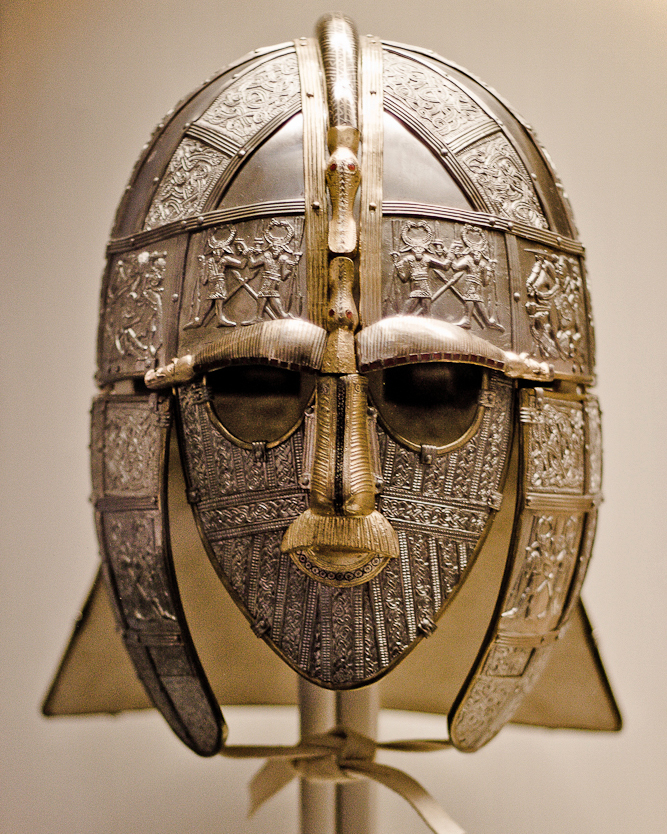
- A replica of the Sutton Hoo helmet, the original of which may have belonged to Rædwald

King of the East Angles
- Reign: c. 599 – c. 624
- Predecessor: Tytila
- Successor: Eorpwald
- Died: c. 624
- Burial: considered by many experts to be the occupant of the ship-burial at Sutton Hoo, Suffolk
- Spouse: unknown
- Issue: Rægenhere and Eorpwald of East Anglia
- Dynasty: Wuffingas
- Father: Tytila of East Anglia
- Religion: Syncretic pagan-Christian

Rædwald (Old English: Rædwald, pronounced [ˈrædwɑɫd]; 'power in counsel'), also written as Raedwald or Redwald (Latin: Raedwaldus, Reduald), (died c. 624) was a king of East Anglia, an Anglo-Saxon kingdom which included the present-day English counties of Norfolk and Suffolk. He was the son of Tytila of East Anglia and a member of the Wuffingas dynasty (named after his grandfather, Wuffa), who were the first kings of the East Angles. Details about Rædwald's reign are scarce, primarily because the Viking invasions of the 9th century destroyed the monasteries in East Anglia where many documents would have been kept. Rædwald reigned from about 599 until his death around 624, initially under the overlordship of Æthelberht of Kent. In 616, as a result of fighting the Battle of the River Idle and defeating Æthelfrith of Northumbria, he was able to install Edwin, who was acquiescent to his authority, as the new king of Northumbria. During the battle, both Æthelfrith and Rædwald's son, Rægenhere, were killed.

From around 616 Rædwald was the most powerful of the English kings south of the Humber estuary. According to Bede, he was the fourth ruler to hold imperium over other southern Anglo-Saxon kingdoms: he was referred to in the Anglo-Saxon Chronicle, written centuries after his death, as a bretwalda (an Old English term meaning 'Britain-ruler' or 'wide-ruler'). He was the first king of the East Angles to become a Christian, converting at Æthelberht's court some time before 605, while also maintaining a pagan temple. He helped Christianity to survive in East Anglia during the apostasy of the Anglo-Saxon kingdoms of Essex and Kent. Historians consider him the most likely occupant of the Sutton Hoo ship-burial, although other theories have been advanced. A smaller ship-burial was also discovered in 1998 close to the original Sutton Hoo site, which is thought to have contained the body of his son Rægenhere, who died in battle in 616.

== Sources ==
The kingdom of East Anglia (Old English: Ēastengla rīċe) was a small independent Anglo-Saxon kingdom that comprised what are now the English counties of Norfolk and Suffolk and perhaps the eastern part of the Cambridgeshire Fens. Much less documentary evidence survives from East Anglia than from other Anglo-Saxon kingdoms. The historian Barbara Yorke argues that East Anglia almost certainly produced a similar range of written materials, but they were destroyed during the Viking conquest in the 9th century.

Rædwald is the first king of the East Angles of whom more than a name is known, though no details of his life before his accession are known. The earliest and most substantial source for Rædwald is the Historia ecclesiastica gentis Anglorum (Ecclesiastical History of the English People), completed in 731 by Bede, a Northumbrian monk. Bede placed Rædwald's reign between the advent of the Gregorian mission to Kent in 597 and the marriage and conversion of Edwin of Northumbria during 625–626.

Later medieval chroniclers, such as Roger of Wendover, gave some information about East Anglian events, but Yorke suggests that the annalistic format used forced these writers to guess the dates of the key events they recorded. Such later sources are therefore treated with caution. The Anglian collection, which dates from the late 8th century, contains an East Anglian genealogical tally, but Rædwald is not included. Rædwald is however referred to in the 8th century Vita of St Gregory the Great, written by a member of the religious community at Whitby. The Battle of the River Idle, in which Rædwald and his forces defeated the Northumbrians, is described in the 12th century Historia Anglorum, written by Henry of Huntingdon.

== The context of Rædwald's kingdom ==
The main Anglo-Saxon kingdoms

The Anglo-Saxons, who are known to have included Angles, Saxons, Jutes and Frisians, began to arrive in Britain in the 5th century. By 600, a number of kingdoms had begun to form in the conquered territories. By the beginning of the 7th century, the southern part of what became England was almost entirely under their control.

During Rædwald's youth, the establishment of other ruling houses was accomplished. Sometime before 588, Æthelberht of Kent married Bercta, the Christian daughter of the Frankish ruler Charibert I. As early as 568, Ceawlin of Wessex, the most powerful ruler south of the Humber estuary, repulsed Æthelberht. According to later sources, Mercia was founded by Creoda in 585, although a paucity of sources makes it difficult to know how the Mercian royal line became established.

North of the Humber, the kingdoms of Deira and Bernicia possessed rival royal dynasties. Ælla ruled Deira until his death in 588, leaving his daughter Acha, his son Edwin, and another unknown sibling. The Bernician dynasty, allied by kinship to the kingdom of Wessex, gained ascendancy over Deira, forcing Edwin to live in exile in the court of Cadfan ap Iago of Gwynedd. In various wars, Æthelfrith of Bernicia consolidated the Northumbrian state, and in around 604 he was able to bring Deira under his dominion.

== Family ==
Rædwald, which in Old English means 'power in counsel', was born around 560–580. The son of Tytila, whom he succeeded, he was the elder brother of Eni. According to Bede, he was descended from Wuffa, the founder of the Wuffingas dynasty: filius Tytili, cuius pater fuit UUffa ('the son of Tytil, whose father was Wuffa').

At some time during the 590s, Rædwald married a woman whose name is unknown, though it is known from Bede that she was pagan. By her he fathered at least two sons, Rægenhere and Eorpwald. He also had an older son, Sigeberht, whose name is unlike other Wuffingas names but which is typical of the East Saxon dynasty. It has been suggested that Rædwald's queen had previously been married to a member of the Essex royal family and that Sigeberht was Rædwald's stepson, as was stated by William of Malmesbury in the 12th century. Sigeberht earned the enmity of his step-father, who drove him into exile in Gaul, possibly to protect the Wuffingas bloodline.

Wehha
Wuffa
Tytila
?	Rædwald	?	Eni	?
Sigeberht	Rægenhere	Eorpwald

For a family tree that includes the descendants of Eni, see Wuffingas.

== Early reign and baptism ==
A topographical map of the kingdom of the East Angles

In 597 in the early years of Rædwald's reign Augustine of Canterbury arrived on mission from Rome, leading to the conversion of the bretwalda Æthelberht of Kent as well as Saeberht of Essex, and the establishment of new bishoprics in their kingdoms.

Bede states that Rædwald also converted to Christianity, presumably at the invitation of Æthelberht who may have been his baptismal sponsor. The date of his conversion is unknown, but it is likely to have been around 604 or later. Since it is claimed that Augustine, who died in about 605, dedicated a church near Ely, it may have swiftly followed Saebert's conversion in 604. Rædwald's marriage to a member of the royal dynasty of Essex helped form a diplomatic alliance between the neighbouring kingdoms of East Anglia and Essex. His conversion in Kent would have affiliated him with Æthelberht, bringing him directly into the sphere of Kent.

Bede describes Rædwald's relationship with Æthelberht in an ambiguous passage which implies that Rædwald retained ducatus, or military command of his people, while Æthelberht held imperium. This implies that being a bretwalda usually included holding the military command of other kingdoms and also that it was more than that, since Æthelberht is bretwalda despite Rædwald's control of his own troops. Rædwald did not fully abandon his pagan beliefs which together with the fact that he retained military independence, implies that Æthelberht's overlordship of East Anglia was much weaker than his influence with the East Saxons. An alternative interpretation, however, is that the passage in Bede should be translated as "Rædwald, king of the East Angles, who while Æthelberht lived, even conceded to him the military leadership of his people"; if this is Bede's intent, then East Anglia firmly was under Æthelberht's overlordship.

In East Anglia, Rædwald's conversion was not universally accepted by his household or his own queen. According to the historian Steven Plunkett, she and her pagan teachers persuaded him to default in part from his commitment to the Christian faith. As a result, he kept in the temple two altars, one dedicated to pagan gods and the other to Christ. Bede, writing decades later, described how Ealdwulf of East Anglia, a grandson of Rædwald's brother Eni, recalled seeing the temple when he was a boy. It may have been located at Rendlesham, emerging focus of the regio of the Wuffing dynasty, according to Plunkett. Barbara Yorke argues that Rædwald was not willing to fully embrace Christianity because conversion via Æthelberht would have been acknowledgment of an inferior status to the Kentish king. Rædwald's lack of commitment towards Christianity earned him the enmity of Bede, who regarded him as a renouncer of the faith.

== Rædwald and Edwin of Northumbria ==
=== Edwin's exile ===
Æthelfrith of Northumbria may have married Acha, who was the mother of his son Oswald (born in about 604), according to Bede. Æthelfrith pursued Acha's exiled brother Edwin in an attempt to destroy him and ensure that the Bernician rulership of Northumbria would be unchallenged. Edwin found hospitality in the household of Cearl of Mercia and later married Cearl's daughter. Edwin's nephew Hereric, an exile in the British kingdom of Elmet, was slain there under treacherous circumstances. Edwin eventually sought the protection of Rædwald, where he was received willingly. Rædwald promised to protect him, and Edwin lived with the king amongst his royal companions. When news of Edwin reached Æthelfrith in Northumbria, he sent messengers to Rædwald offering money in return for Edwin's death, but Rædwald refused to comply. Æthelfrith sent messengers a second and a third time, offering even greater gifts of silver and promising war if these were not accepted. Rædwald then weakened and promised either to kill Edwin or to hand him over to ambassadors.

When a chance arose for him to escape to a safe country, Edwin chose to remain at Rædwald's court. He was then visited by a stranger who was aware of Rædwald's deliberations. The source for this story, written at Whitby, stated that the stranger was Paulinus of York, a member of the Canterbury mission, who offered Edwin the hope of Rædwald's support and held out the prospect that Edwin might someday attain greater royal power than any previous English king. Paulinus was assured by Edwin that he would accept his religious teaching. His vision of Paulinus was afterwards made the means of his decision to embrace Christianity, on the condition that he survived and achieved power. If, as is supposed by some, Paulinus appeared to him in the flesh, the bishop's presence at Rædwald's court would throw some light on the king's position regarding religion.

Rædwald's pagan queen admonished him for acting in a manner dishonourable for a king by betraying his trust for the sake of money and wanting to sell his imperiled friend in exchange for riches. As a result of her admonishment, once Æthelfrith's ambassadors had gone, Rædwald resolved on war.

=== The Battle of the River Idle ===
In 616 or 617 Rædwald assembled an army and marched north, accompanied by his son Rægenhere, to confront Æthelfrith. They met on the western boundary of the kingdom of Lindsey, on the east bank of the River Idle. The battle was fierce and was long commemorated in the saying, 'The river Idle was foul with the blood of Englishmen'. During the fighting, Æthelfrith and Rædwald's son Rægenhere were both slain. Edwin then succeeded Æthelfrith as the king of Northumbria, and Æthelfrith's sons were subsequently forced into exile.

A separate account of the battle, given by Henry of Huntingdon, stated that Rædwald's army was split into three formations, led by Rædwald, Rægenhere, and Edwin. With more experienced fighters, Æthelfrith attacked in loose formation. At the sight of Rægenhere, perhaps thinking he was Edwin, Æthelfrith's men cut their way through to him and slew him. After the death of his son, Rædwald furiously breached his lines, killing Æthelfrith amid a great slaughter of the Northumbrians.

The historian David Peter Kirby has argued that the battle was more than a clash between two kings over the treatment of an exiled nobleman but was "part of a protracted struggle to determine the military and political leadership of the Anglian peoples" at that time.

== Rædwald's imperium ==
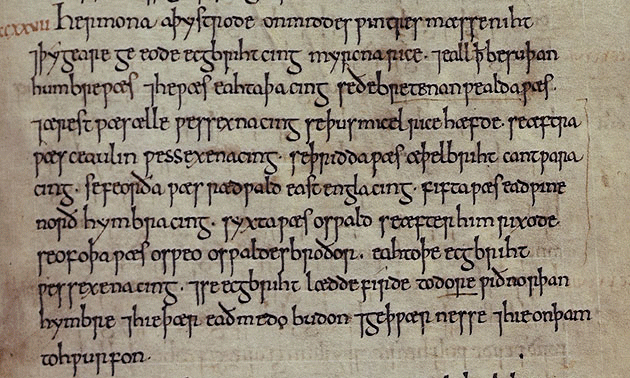
The entry for 827 in one of the Abingdon manuscripts of the Anglo-Saxon Chronicle, which lists the eight bretwaldas. Rædwald's name can be seen as the fourth word on the sixth line.

On 24 February 616, the year of the Battle of the River Idle, Æthelberht of Kent died and was succeeded by his pagan son Eadbald. After the death of the Christian Saebert of Essex, his three sons shared the kingdom, returning it to pagan rule, and drove out the Gregorian missionaries led by Mellitus. The Canterbury mission had removed to Gaul before Eadbald was brought back into the fold. During this period the only royal Christian altar in England belonged to Rædwald. By the time of his death, the mission in Kent had been fully re-established.

Rædwald's power became great enough for Bede to recognise him as the successor to the imperium of Æthelberht. Bede also called him Rex Anglorum, the 'King of the Angles', a term that Rædwald's contemporaries would have used for their overlord. It is unclear where his power was centred or even how he established his authority over the Angles of eastern England.

By Edwin's debt of allegiance to him, Rædwald became the first foreign king to hold direct influence in Northumbria. He would have been instrumental in Edwin's secure establishment as king of both Deira and Bernicia.

== The development of Gipeswic ==
During the first quarter of the 7th century, the quayside settlement at Gipeswic (Ipswich) became an important estuarine trading centre, receiving imported goods such as pottery from other trading markets situated around the coasts of the North Sea. Steven Plunkett suggests that the founding of Gipeswic took place under the supervision of Wuffingas. It took another hundred years for the settlement to develop into a town, but its beginnings can be seen as a reflection of the personal importance of Rædwald during the period of his supremacy.

The excavated grave-goods of the Anglo-Saxon cemetery at Gipeswic, including those found in burials under small barrows, were not particularly wealthy or elaborate. They lacked the strong characterization of a neighbouring late 6th century cemetery at a higher crossing of the river. One exception was a furnished grave that has been suggested to be that of a visitor from the Rhineland.

== Death ==
Rædwald is believed to have died around 624: his death date can be narrowed down to only within a few years. He must have reigned for some time after Æthelberht died, in order for him to have been noted as a bretwalda. Barbara Yorke suggests that he died before Edwin converted to Christianity in 627 and also before Paulinus became Bishop of Northumbria in 625. His death is recorded twice by Roger of Wendover, in 599 and in 624, in a history that dates from the 13th century but appears to include earlier annals of unknown origin and reliability. Plunkett notes that the earlier date of 599 is now taken as a mistaken reference to the death of Rædwald's father, Tytila, and the later date is commonly given for the death of Rædwald.

=== Legacy ===
It was Rædwald's conversion to Christianity rather than his apostasy that was to take hold. He was succeeded by his pagan son Eorpwald although a pagan when he succeeded to the throne, converted to Christianity persuaded by Edwin of Northumbria. However it was not until Eorpwald's brother Sigeberht took the throne that the ruling house of East Anglia's conversion to Christianity became permanent.

=== Sutton Hoo ===
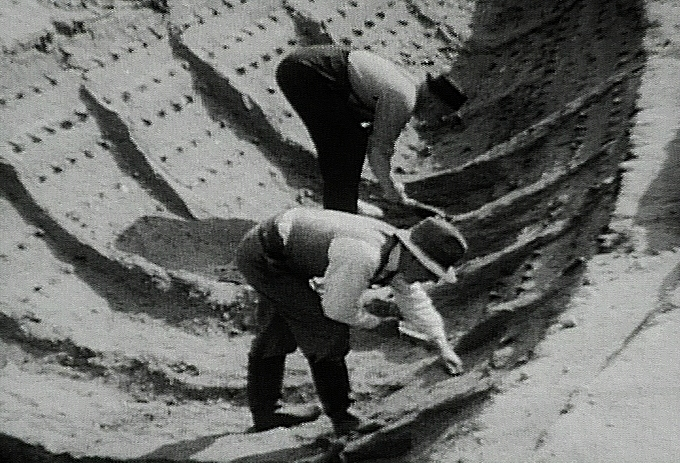
The excavation of the Sutton Hoo burial ship in 1939

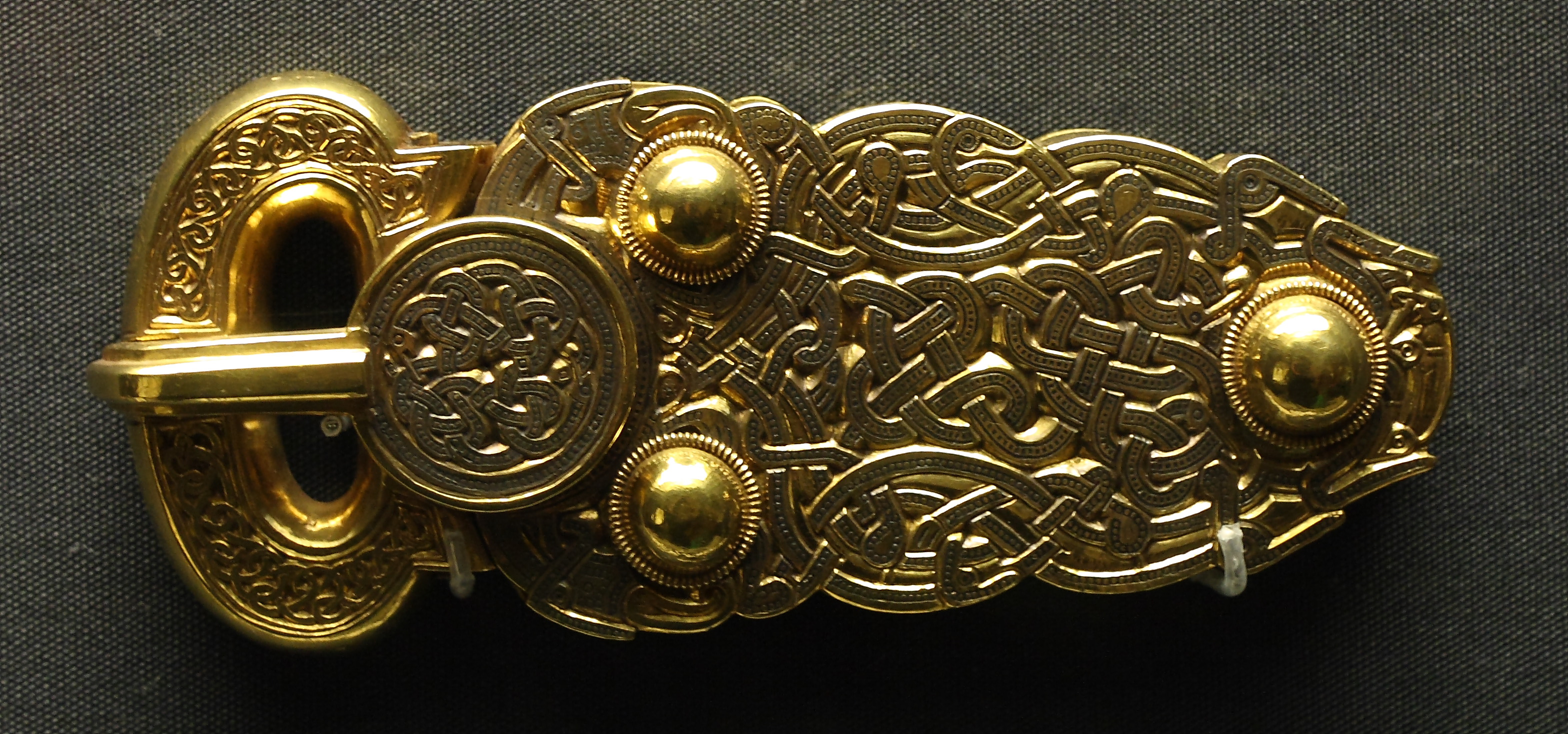
The Great Buckle from Mound 1 at Sutton Hoo, now on permanent display at the British Museum.

Since the excavation of Mound 1 in 1939 at Sutton Hoo, near Woodbridge, Suffolk there has been speculation that Rædwald was the person either buried or commemorated in the main chamber.

Rædwald lived at a time when eminent individuals were buried in barrows at the cemetery at Sutton Hoo three still visible large mounds overlooking the upper estuary of the River Deben. In 1939 the largest mound at Sutton Hoo was found to contain a uniquely rich Anglo-Saxon ship-burial in the centre of which was a chamber containing grave goods for a very wealthy man with items pointing to imperial claims such as consular sceptre which may have been a symbol of the office of bretwalda and gold and garnet body-equipment which employed a goldsmith at the top level in Europe which could project an image of imperial power.

The symbolism and the wealth displayed point to the death of a person connected with the royal court, with Rupert Bruce-Mitford, first positing the burial as "very likely the monument of the High King or bretwalda Rædwald". Yorke suggests that the treasures buried with the ship reflect the size of the tribute paid to Rædwald by subject kings during his period as bretwalda. Bruce-Mitford has suggested that the inclusion of bowls and spoons amongst the treasures fits with Bede's account of Rædwald's conversion: the spoons may have been a present for a convert from paganism and the bowls had Christian significance. Coins found in the burial have been dated to the approximate date of Rædwald's death.

Although this is a likely explanation it is still controversial, as reflected in the comments in the article on Rædwald in the Oxford Dictionary of National Biography ("It has been argued, more strongly than convincingly, that Rædwald must be the man buried in Mound 1 at Sutton Hoo") and by McClure and Collins, who note that the evidence for Rædwald is "almost non-existent". Alternative suggestions as candidates include other East Anglian kings or a prestigious foreign visitor, or a wealthy status-seeker, rather than a king, though Rendlesham, a known residence of the East Anglian kings, is only 4 miles (6.4 km) away.

Swedish cultural influence has been detected at Sutton Hoo: there are strong similarities in both the armour and the burial with Vendel Period finds from Sweden. Bruce-Mitford suggested that the connection is close enough to imply that the Wuffingas dynasty came from that part of Scandinavia. There are also significant differences, and exact parallels with the workmanship and style of the Sutton Hoo artefacts cannot be found elsewhere; as a result the connection is generally regarded as unproven.

If the mound is a cenotaph rather than a grave, this may mean Rædwald could have received a Christian burial with the mound, whether completed before or after his conversion, being used as a memorial and as symbol of the status of the Kingship of East Anglia.

== See also ==
- Sutton Hoo Helmet

== Sources ==
Primary sources

- Bede (2008). McClure, Judith; Collins, Roger . (eds.). Historia ecclesiastica gentis Anglorum [Ecclesiastical History of the English People]. Oxford, New York: OUP. ISBN 978-0-19-953723-5.
- Bede. "Bede's Ecclesiastical History of the English Nation (1870)".
- Henry of Huntingdon (1853). "The chronicle of Henry of Huntingdon". Translated by Forrester, Thomas. Internet Archive.

Secondary sources

- Bruce-Mitford, Rupert (1974). Aspects of Anglo-Saxon Archæology: Sutton Hoo and other discoveries. London: Ebenezer Baylis and Son Ltd. ISBN 978-0-575-01704-7.
- Bruce-Mitford, R.L.S. (1975). The Sutton Hoo Ship-Burial. Vol. 1. London.
- Campbell, J. (2004). "Rædwald". Dictionary of National Biography. Oxford University Press. doi:10.1093/ref:odnb/23265.
- Dumville, D. (1976). "Anglian Collection of royal genealogies and regnal lists". Anglo-Saxon England. 5. Cambridge University Press: 23–50. doi:10.1017/S0263675100000764. S2CID 162877617.
- Higham, N.J. (1999). "Rædwald". In M. Lapidge; et al. (eds.). The Blackwell Encyclopedia of Anglo-Saxon England. London: Blackwell. ISBN 978-0-631-22492-1.
- Hoggett, Richard (2010). The Archaeology of the East Anglian Conversion. Woodbridge, UK: The Boydell Press. p. 28. ISBN 978-1-84383-595-0.
- Hunt, William (1896). "Redwald" . In Lee, Sidney (ed.). Dictionary of National Biography. Vol. 47. London: Smith, Elder & Co.
- Hunter Blair, Peter (1966). Roman Britain and Early England: 55 B.C. – A.D. 871. W.W. Norton & Company. ISBN 978-0-393-00361-1.
- Kirby, D.P. (2000). The Earliest English Kings. London and New York: Routledge. ISBN 978-0-415-09086-5.
- Koch, John T. (2006). Celtic culture: a historical encyclopedia, Volumes 1-5. Santa Barbara, USA: ABC-CLIO Inc. ISBN 978-1-85109-440-0.
- Newton, S. (1993). The origins of Beowulf and the Pre-Viking Kingdom of East Anglia. Cambridge. ISBN 978-0-85991-472-7.
- Newton, S. (2003). The Reckoning of King Rædwald. Brightlingsea.
- Plunkett, Steven (2005). Suffolk in Anglo-Saxon Times. Stroud: Tempus. ISBN 978-0-7524-3139-0.
- Stenton, Frank M. (1971). Anglo-Saxon England. Clarendon Press. ISBN 978-0-19-821716-9.
- Stenton, F.M. (1959). "The East Anglian Kings in the seventh century". In P. Clemoes (ed.). The Anglo-Saxons: Studies presented to Bruce Dickens. London.
- Yorke, Barbara (2002). Kings and Kingdoms of Early Anglo-Saxon England. London and New York: Routledge. ISBN 978-0-415-16639-3.
- Ziegler, Michelle (1999). "The Politics of Exile in Early Northumbria". The Heroic Age (2).

Attribution

- This article incorporates text from a publication now in the public domain: "Redwald". Dictionary of National Biography. London: Smith, Elder & Co. 1885–1900.

English royalty
Preceded by Tyttla	King of East Anglia; 599 – c. 624	Succeeded by Eorpwald
