= Iken =

Village in Suffolk, England

Coordinates: 52.141381°N 1.522703°E

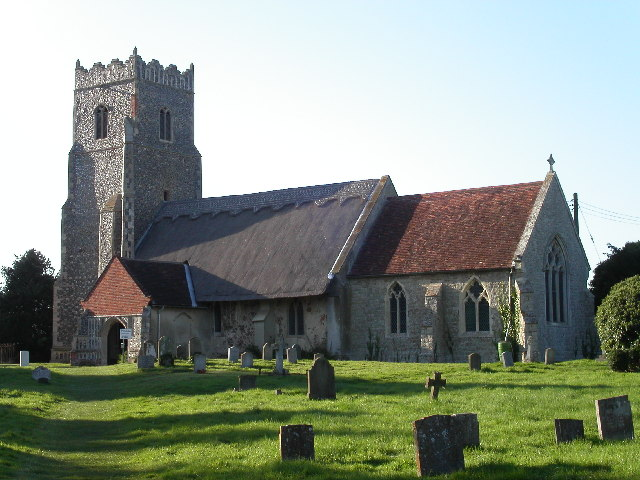
- St Botolph's Church, Iken

- Location within Suffolk
- Population: 101 (2011)
- District: East Suffolk
- Shire county: Suffolk
- Region: East
- Country: England
- Sovereign state: United Kingdom
- Post town: Woodbridge
- Postcode district: IP12
- UK Parliament: Suffolk Coastal

Iken is a small village and civil parish in the sandlands of the English county of Suffolk, an area formerly of heathland and sheep pasture. It is near the estuary of the River Alde on the North Sea coast and is located south east of Snape and due north of Orford. To its west is Tunstall Forest, created since the 1920s by the Forestry Commission and now part of the Sandlings Forest.

Iken was part of Sudbourne Hall Estate. It was composed largely of tenant farms and cottages for farm workers. The owners of the estate valued the area more for shooting than farming, and a decoy pond was built at Iken in the eighteenth century. Since the break up of the Estate Iken has remained a "close" village: only a handful of new houses have been built and no council houses have ever been built.

In the pre-railway era Iken Cliff was a commercial area used for transporting coal and wheat, and there was a public house near the shore. Flat barges used to sit on the mud at low tide and goods were moved in wheelbarrows. The last heathland around Iken Cliff was ploughed up after the second world war.

The population reached a peak of 380 in 1840, steadily declining to around 100.

During World War II most of Iken and the neighbouring village of Sudbourne were used as a battle training area in advance of the D-Day landings in June 1944. The inhabitants were relocated returning sometime after the war finished.

Benjamin Britten set his opera The Little Sweep in Iken Hall, then the home of Margery Spring Rice, who was one of the founders of the Aldeburgh Festival. Britten, who then lived at Snape, was involved in an unsuccessful campaign to keep open a footpath along the Alde to Iken Church.

== St Botolph's Church ==
The Anchorage, formerly an island in what was a marsh at the edge of the estuary, is the most likely site of Saint Botolph's Abbey, Ikenhoe, although this is disputed with other possible locations, including Boston in Lincolnshire, and Hadstock on the Cambridgeshire/Essex border. During excavations in 1977 Dr Stanley West discovered part of a large stone Saxon cross incorporated into the wall of St Botolph's Church tower. The Cross was carved with the heads of dogs and wolves, symbols which were traditionally recognised as St Botolph's emblems during the Middle Ages and therefore it is thought that the cross may originally have been a memorial to him.

The Church is Grade II listed; it is the only listed building in the village. At the time of the most recent amendment to the listing (1984), the church was still burnt out. The nave is the oldest part, dating from before 1200. The chancel fell into disuse after the Reformation, and was in ruins by the 18th century. It was rebuilt in 1853. The tower is 15th century. The church suffered a devastating fire in 1968, caused by sparks from a bonfire. It is one of 18 churches in the Wilford Benefice Group of Churches.

Features inside the church include a war memorial in the Church to the ten men of the village who died in WWI, an Orthodox icon to St Botolph, and a 15th-century octagonal font.

Julian Tennyson, (1915-1945), writer and historian, most famous for his writings on his home county of Suffolk, is commemorated by a headstone in the churchyard of St Botolph's. He was killed in action in Burma.

The former rectory next door, now the Anchorage, was sold to a private individual after the Second World War, and as a result of a conveyancing mistake, access to the church was greatly restricted by the new owner.

== Governance ==
There is a parish council.

Iken was brought to national attention, in the aftermath of the fire, by the decision of the renowned judge, Sir Robert Megarry, to conduct a hearing in person at Iken, partly to take evidence from a witness who was unable to travel to London and partly to conduct a mock funeral in order to test a disputed right of way. The result of that litigation had the effect of requiring the materials for the rebuilding of the church to be brought in on foot.

== Buildings ==
There are two former pubs in the village: the Anchor and the Boot both of which closed in the 19th century.

There was also a poorhouse established by the early nineteenth century. George Crabbe the poet used to attend poorer patients in Iken in his days as a surgeon, and his poem "The Workhouse" may have been based on his experience at Iken as well as at Aldeburgh. The former workhouse building was purchased by the Sudbourne Hall Estate in 1896.
