= Eni of East Anglia =

Anglo-Saxon noble

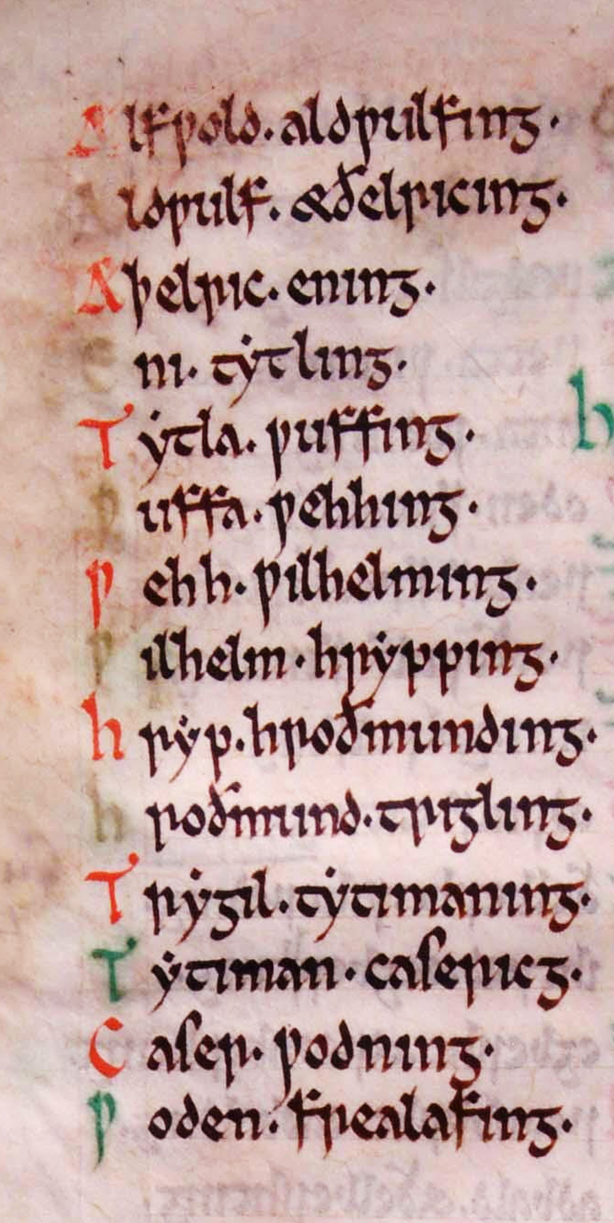
'Eni Tytling' (4th line), as recorded in the Textus Roffensis

Eni or Ennius was a member of the Wuffing family, the ruling dynasty of the kingdom of East Anglia. He was the son of the semi-historical pagan king Tyttla and the brother of Rædwald, who both ruled East Anglia.

There is no historical evidence that Eni ever ruled the East Angles. The principal references to him are in Ecclesiastical History of the English People, written by the Benedictine monk Bede in c. 731, and in the East Anglian dynastic tally preserved in the Anglian collection. The tally is not a regnal list but a series of genealogical affiliations; hence it does not mention Rædwald, who was not a direct ancestor of the line of Eni.

It is possible, but nowhere indicated, that Rædwald associated Eni to his power as an East Anglian regent or sub-king during the period of his own ascendancy, 616–624. Eorpwald, Rædwald's son, succeeded his father.

Eni is identified by Bede as the father of three East Anglian kings: Anna (r. c. 636–654), Aethelhere (r. 654) and Aethelwold (r. 654–664). In the Anglian collection he is also the grandfather of King Ealdwulf (r. 664–713), whose father was Æthelric. Since royal power reverted to Ealdwulf in 664 after the rule of his uncles, it is often supposed that Æthelric was actually the elder brother of Anna, Æthelhere and Æthelwold and may be the same person as Egric of East Anglia, who shared the throne with Sigeberht (c. 629–634) and died with him in 636. Hereswitha, Ealdwulf's mother, had already left East Anglia for a monastic life in Gaul by 647 (Bede, History, iv. 23) and so Æthelric was probably dead by then.

Many of Eni's descendants appear to have been devout Christians and as an immediate member of Rædwald's household he must certainly have been aware of, and possibly even shared in, Rædwald's baptism, which occurred in Kent under the sponsorship of King Æthelberht before 616, at the hands of the mission sent by Pope Gregory I. Eni's son Anna was presumably resident at Exning in 631 when Anna's daughter Æthelthryth (Saint Audrey) was born there. Exning is close to the Isle of Ely where, at Cratendune, Saint Augustine of Canterbury himself (died c. 604) is stated (in Liber Eliensis) to have established a church. It is possible, therefore, that the Christianity of Eni's descendants had its origins in an East Anglian phase of Augustine's own mission.

== See also ==
- Wuffingas dynasty family tree
