= Seaxwulf =

7th-century Bishop of Lichfield

- Bishop of Lichfield
- Appointed: before 676
- Term ended: c. 692
- Predecessor: Winfrith
- Successor: Headda
- Other post: Abbot of Medeshamstede

Orders
- Consecration: before 676

Personal details
- Died: c. 692
- Denomination: Christian

Seaxwulf (Note: Or Saxwulf or Sexwulf or Saxulf or Sexulf) (before 676 – c. 692) was the founding abbot of the Mercian monastery of Medeshamstede, and an early medieval bishop of Mercia. Very little is known of him beyond these details, drawn from sources such as Bede's Ecclesiastical History. Some further information was written down in the 12th century at Peterborough Abbey, as Medeshamstede was known by that time. This suggests that he began his career as a nobleman, and that he may have had royal connections outside Mercia.

Seaxwulf's earliest appearance is in the Latinised form "Sexwlfus", in Stephen of Ripon's Vita Sancti Wilfrithi, or "Life of St Wilfrid", of the early 8th century. As is common with proper nouns, this name is found in numerous different forms in medieval writings; but it is most commonly rendered into modern English as "Saxwulf" or "Sexwulf" when used for a confirmation name. An Old English name, it means "dagger wolf", or possibly "Saxon wolf".

== History ==
Seaxwulf, and a unique biographical reference, in King Æthelred's charter (S 72): taken from the 12th-century manuscript, he appears here in the genitive, Latinised form "Saxulfi"

It is not known when or where Seaxwulf was born, but Bede identifies him as founder and first abbot of Medeshamstede, later known as Peterborough Abbey, in a context dateable prior to the mid 670s. Bede also describes him as bishop "of Lindsey, [and] also of the Mercians and Middle Angles". He was consecrated as bishop, with his episcopal seat, or "see", at Lichfield, before 676 AD; he died about 692. During his episcopate, Archbishop Theodore of Canterbury split the diocese into several smaller bishoprics. In 676, Seaxwulf gave refuge to Bishop Putta of Rochester. In a similar development, Seaxwulf's near contemporary Stephen of Ripon mentions Wilfrid's period of exile in Mercia, "amid the profound respect of that bishopric which the most reverend Bishop [Seaxwulf] had formerly ruled".

== Identity and status ==
Beyond the details recording Seaxwulf's foundation and abbacy of Medeshamstede, and his episcopacy in Mercia, there are scattered references suggesting that Seaxwulf had previously been an important nobleman, and that he played a similarly important role as abbot, and later as bishop. John Blair has summarised what is known of Seaxwulf, in his entry for the Dictionary of National Biography:

It seems likely that Seaxwulf was a layman of high rank who adopted the religious life and used his worldly wealth to found a monastery for himself, in the mould of his near-contemporary Benedict Biscop. ... and it is a reasonable conjecture that Seaxwulf was either a leading member or a supplanter of [the Gyrwas, the local tribe].

— John Blair, "Seaxwulf (d. c.692)", Dictionary of National Biography.

Hugh Candidus, a 12th-century chronicler of Peterborough, described Seaxwulf as a "man of great power", and a man "zealous and [religious], and well skilled in the things of this world, and also in the affairs of the [Church]." Another biographical reference to Seaxwulf is in a charter of King Æthelred of Mercia. This charter is a late 11th or early 12th century forgery, written for Peterborough Abbey – meaning that it nonetheless existed there before Hugh Candidus wrote his chronicle – but it is of historical interest for some of the locally important information which it contains. It describes Seaxwulf as a recently orphaned foreigner, and this biographical detail is not found in any other known, surviving source.

Blair's "reasonable conjecture" suggests in effect that Seaxwulf may have been a member of local royalty, since Bede records the existence of a prince of the Gyrwas. Meanwhile, Dorothy Whitelock believed that Seaxwulf had probably been educated in East Anglia, given the heathen state of Mercia prior to the mid 7th century. Also, while East Anglia had been under sustained attack from Mercia through much of the 7th century up to Seaxwulf's time, his contemporary King Æthelhere of East Anglia is seen as a "Mercian dependent". Thus the entire region in which Seaxwulf operated was, at the time, under Mercian domination. The following details suggest a possible milieu within which Seaxwulf operated.

- Taken together, Blair and Whitelock place Seaxwulf in East Anglia prior to his involvement with Medeshamstede, and suggest that he may have been royal. Also, the charter for Mercian Medeshamstede describes him as a recently orphaned foreigner. King Anna of East Anglia died in about 653, at the beginning of the period in which Medeshamstede is believed to have been founded (c.653–656).
- Seaxwulf's name alliterates with that of Seaxburh of Ely, who was a daughter of King Anna. Alliteration such as that between the names "Seaxwulf" and "Seaxburh" was a common feature in Old English personal name giving within families. Further, these names are extremely uncommon: while Seaxwulf is the only recorded bearer of that name before the 11th century, only two "Seaxburh"s are recorded, the other being a contemporary princess of Wessex.
- Medeshamstede, founded by Seaxwulf, and Ely, founded by Seaxburh's sister Æthelthryth, were both located in the territory of the Gyrwas. Listed in the Tribal Hidage, they were long fought over by East Anglia and Mercia.
- Seaxburh retired to Ely after the death of her husband Tondberht, who is described in Bede's Ecclesiastical History as a "prince of the South Gyrwas".

Given his subsequent elevation to the Mercian bishopric, clearly Seaxwulf was successful in his work at Medeshamstede, "one of the greatest monasteries of the Mercian kingdom". This success, and the reported shelter given by Seaxwulf to Bishop Putta of Rochester, also indicate a close political relationship between Seaxwulf and the Mercian King Æthelred: Putta had abandoned his see at Rochester when, according to Bede, King Æthelred had destroyed it.

== Notes ==
Christian titles
Preceded by Winfrith	Bishop of Lichfield; 675–c. 691	Succeeded by Headda
