= Ealdbeorht =

Ealdbeorht is an Anglo-Saxon name and may refer to:

- another name for Aldberht (died c. 784), Bishop of Hereford
- Ealdbeorht I (died after 731), Bishop of Dunwich
- Ealdbeorht II (died between 775 and 781), Bishop of Dunwich (existence unclear)
