= Winfred =

Winfred can mean:

- Winfred, South Dakota
- Saint Boniface (Winfrid/Winfred)
- Winfred (bishop), bishop of Mercia and Lindsey, successor to Chad of Mercia
