= Ealdbeorht II =

8th-century Bishop of Dunwich

- Bishop of Dunwich
- Church: Catholic
- In office: (?) some time after 747 to some time before 781
- Predecessor: Eardwulf
- Successor: Heardred of Dunwich

Orders
- Consecration: between 747 and 775

Personal details
- Died: between 775 and 781

Ealdbeorht (or Alberthus or Ealdberht) may have been a medieval Bishop of Dunwich.

According to Powicke and Fryde (2nd ed., 1961) Ealdbeorht was in office as bishop of Dunwich in 775, having succeeded Eardwulf some time after 747, and in turn being succeeded by Heardred some time before 781.

However, he is not included in the list of bishops in the third edition of the book (1986), where no entry intervenes between Eardwulf and Heardred. Nor was he included in the Prosopography of Anglo-Saxon England.

It would seem that whatever source was previously thought to imply his existence is now no longer thought to do so.

== Citations ==
Christian titles
Preceded by Eardwulf	Bishop of Dunwich between 747 and 781	Succeeded by Heardred of Dunwich
