= Cuthwine (disambiguation) =

Cuthwine (c. 565–593) was a member of the House of Wessex and the son of King Ceawlin of Wessex.

Cuthwine may also refer to:

- Cuthwine of Dunwich (8th century), Bishop of Dunwich
- Cuthwine of Leicester (died c. 691), Bishop of Leicester
