= Wynfrith =

Wynfrith is an Old English/Anglo-Saxon name.

== People with the name ==
- Saint Boniface, an English missionary who preached Christianity in the Frankish Empire during the 8th century; patron saint of Germany.
- Winfrith (bishop), a bishop of Lichfield.
