= Bifus =

7th-century Bishop of the East Angles

- Bishop of the East Angles
- Appointed: c. 664
- Term ended: 672
- Predecessor: Brigilsus
- Successor: See divided into Dunwich and Elmham Bedwinus (as Bishop of Elmham) Acca (as Bishop of Dunwich)

Orders
- Consecration: 669 or 670

Personal details
- Died: unknown
- Denomination: Christian

Bifus or Bisi was an English cleric who served as a medieval Bishop of the East Angles.

Bifus' consecration is normally dated to 669 or 670. However, there is reason to suspect the Venerable Bede made a mistake and he was actually consecrated in 664. He resigned the see in 672. He was the last bishop of the East Angles.

Bede in his history, records that he attended the Council of Hertford in 672. When he resigned, his bishopric was divided into the sees of Dunwich and Elmham.
