= Westerne =

Anglo-Saxon tribe

The Westerne were an Anglo-Saxon tribe, probably in western England. The name is a genitive plural and probably means "the westerners". They occur only in the Tribal Hidage, an early eighth-century catalogue of kingdoms and principalities produced in Mercia for the purposes of tax or tribute. Little is known about them, not even precisely where they were. Their position in the Tribal Hidage list suggests a location on the western fringe of the Mercian heartland and it is possible that they were associated with the Magonsaetan, who occupied the lands around Leominster and Hereford. There are very few Anglo-Saxon cemeteries from the area, which may indicate that Mercian rulers took over an existing British political region, possibly that of the Romano-British civitas of the Cornovii. The Tribal Hidage assessment for the Westerne (7,000 hides) ranks them alongside other minor kingdoms such as Lindsey, the Hwicce, the East Saxons and the South Saxons. It is likely that the area was ruled by an ealdorman, a senior noble representing the interest of the kings of Mercia.

The tribe became part of the Kingdom of Mercia, but the region continued as a significant political division as late as 1016 when ealdorman Eadric led the Magonsaetan against Cnut.

== See also ==
- Magonsæte
