= Thomas (bishop of the East Angles) =

7th-century Bishop of the East Angles

- Bishop of the East Angles
- Appointed: between 647 and 648
- Term ended: between 652 and 653
- Predecessor: Felix
- Successor: Brigilsus

Orders
- Consecration: between 647 and 648 by Honorius of Canterbury

Personal details
- Died: between 652 and 653
- Denomination: Christian

Thomas was an early medieval Bishop of the East Angles. He was consecrated between 647 and 648 and died between 652 and 653. He was bishop for five years.

Bede described Thomas as having been "from the province of the Gyrwas" and deacon to Felix of Burgundy.
