= Bishop of Dunwich (ancient) =

The Anglo-Saxon dioceses 850–925

The Bishop of Dunwich is an episcopal title which was first used by an Anglo-Saxon bishop between the seventh and ninth centuries and is currently used by the suffragan bishop of the Diocese of St Edmundsbury and Ipswich. The title takes its name after Dunwich in the English county of Suffolk. Previously a significant port, this town has now largely been lost to the sea.

In about 630 or 631 a diocese was established by St. Felix for the Kingdom of the East Angles, with his episcopal seat initially, briefly established at Soham before being transferred to Dunwich on the Suffolk coast. There is a possibility the unidentified Dommoc may be Dunwich, but this is yet to be proved. In 672 the diocese was divided into the sees of Dunwich and Elmham by St. Theodore, Archbishop of Canterbury.

The line of bishops of Dunwich continued until it was interrupted by the Danish Viking invasions in the late ninth and early tenth centuries. By the mid 950s the sees of Dunwich and Elmham were reunited under one bishop, with the episcopal see at Elmham.

== List of bishops ==
Bishops of the East Angles (purportedly established at Soham)
From	Until	Incumbent	Notes.
c.630	c.630	Felix of Burgundy	Also known as St Felix
Bishops of the East Angles (established at Dunwich or translated from Soham)
630 x 631	647 x 648	Felix of Burgundy	Also known as St Felix.
647 x 648	652 x 653	Thomas	Deacon.
652 x 653	669 x 670	Brigilsus	Also recorded as Beorhtgils, Berhtgils, and Boniface (Bonifatius).
669 x 670	672	Bifus	Resigned in 672; also recorded as Bisi.
In 672, the diocese was divided into the sees of Dunwich and Elmham
Bishops of Dunwich
From	Until	Incumbent	Notes.
672 x ?	?	Acca	Also recorded as Æcce and Æcci.
?	?	Ascwulf	
? x 716	716 x ?	Eardred	
?	?	Cuthwine	Also recorded as Cuthwynus.
? x 731	731 x ?	Ealdbeorht I	Also recorded as Alberht.
?	?	Ecglaf	Also recorded as Eglasius.
? x 747	747 x ?	Eardwulf	Also recorded as Heardwulf.
747 x 775	775 x 781	Ealdbeorht II	Also recorded as Alberthus and Ealdberht.
? x 781	789 x 793	Heardred	Also recorded as Hardulfus.
789 x 793	798	Ælfhun	Also recorded as Ælphunus.
798	816 x 824	Tidfrith	Also recorded as Tidfreth, Tedfrid, and Thefridus.
816 x 824	824 x 825	Waormund	Also recorded as Wærmund and Weremundus.
825	845 x 870	Wilred	Also recorded as Wilfredus.
845 x 870	?	Æthelweald	Also recorded as Æthelwold, Æthelwulf.
After interruption by the Danish Viking invasions, Dunwich was united to the see of Elmham.
Note(s): ^{[A]} and Source(s):

== Footnotes ==
- ^{A} The current list of Anglo-Saxon bishops is primarily compiled by the 3rd edition of the Handbook of British Chronology. The earlier 2nd edition mentioned two others: Alric, probably bishop of Dunwich and Husa, bishop of Dunwich or Elmham. These two are no longer considered to have been bishops and as such are not listed in the 3rd edition.
