= Æthelweald =

9th-century Bishop of Dunwich

- Bishop of Dunwich
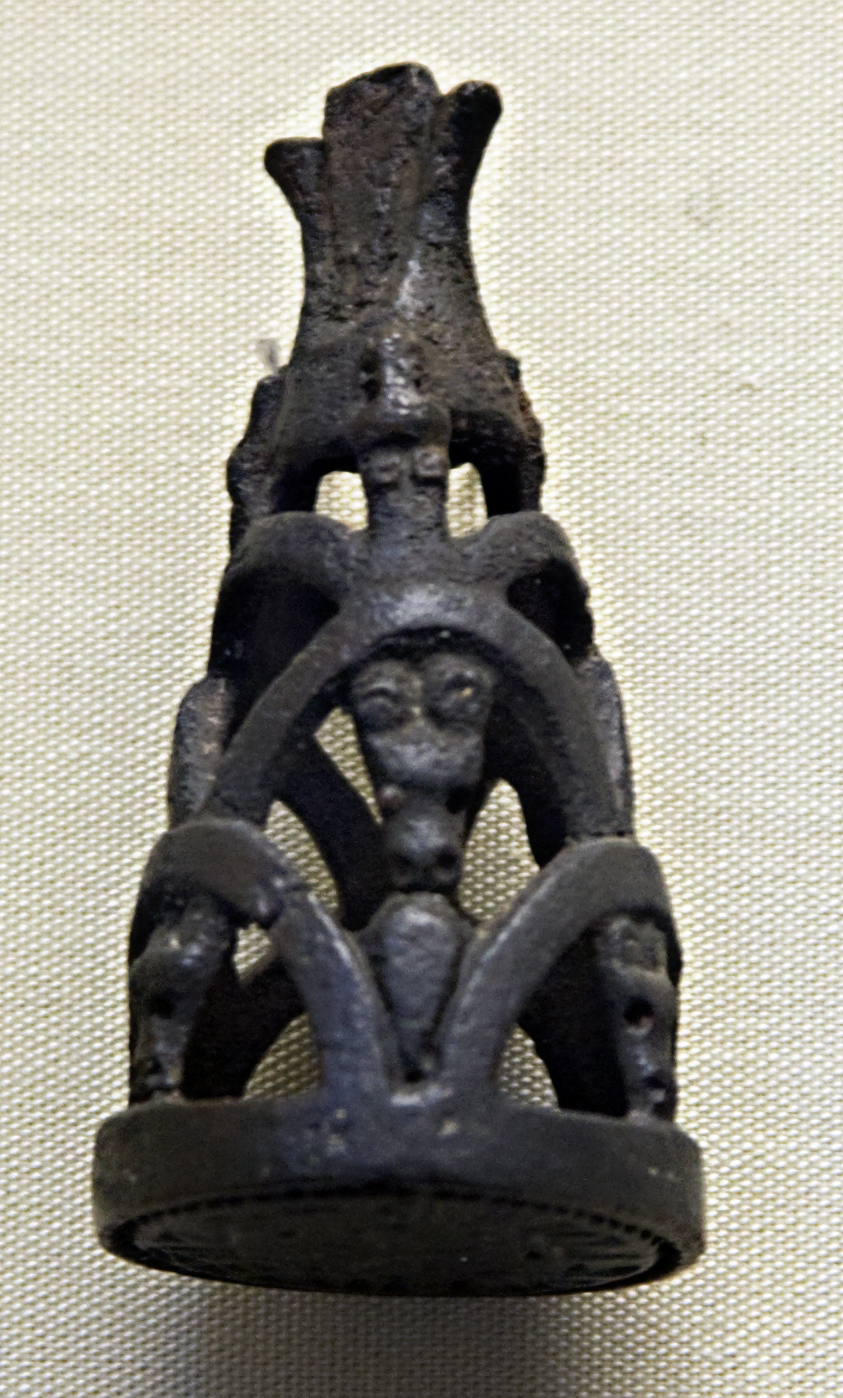
- Seal in the British Museum, referring to a Bishop Ethilwald, which probably belonged to Æthelweald
- Appointed: between 845 and 870
- Predecessor: Wilred
- Successor: See united with Elmham

Orders
- Consecration: between 845 and 870

Personal details
- Denomination: Christian

Æthelweald (or Æthelwald) was a medieval Bishop of Dunwich.

Æthelweald was consecrated between 845 and 870, but his death date is unknown. After Æthelweald, there was an interruption with the episcopal succession through Danish Viking invasions in the late 9th and early 10th centuries. By the mid-10th century, Dunwich had been united to the see of Elmham.
