= Ascwulf =

8th-century Bishop of Dunwich

- Bishop of Dunwich
- In office: dates unknown
- Predecessor: Acca of Dunwich
- Successor: Eardred

Personal details
- Died: unknown
- Denomination: Christian

Ascwulf (or Æscwulf) was a medieval Bishop of Dunwich. He was bishop in the 8th century, but it is not known exactly when he was consecrated or his date of death.
