= Brigilsus =

7th-century Bishop of the East Angles

- Bishop of the East Angles
- Appointed: between 652 and 653
- Term ended: c. 669 and 670
- Predecessor: Thomas
- Successor: Bifus

Orders
- Consecration: between 652 and 653 by Honorius of Canterbury

Personal details
- Died: c. 669 or 670
- Denomination: Christian

Brigilsus (Note: Or Beorhtgils or Berhtgils or Boniface) was a medieval Bishop of the East Angles.

Brigilsus was consecrated between 652 and 653. He died about 669 or 670. He was consecrated by Archbishop Honorius of Canterbury.
