= Ælfhun =

8th-century Bishop of Dunwich

- Bishop of Dunwich
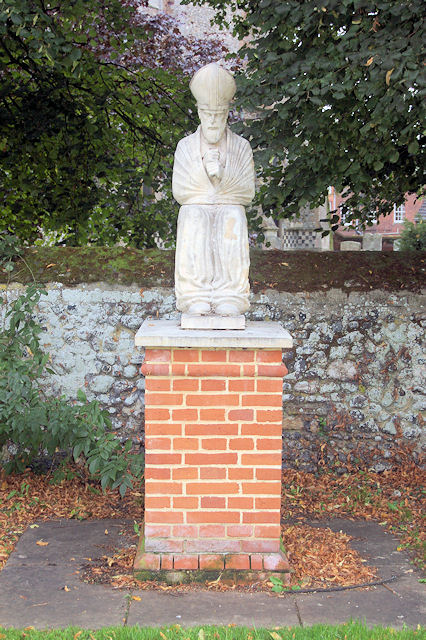
- Modern statue of Ælfhun in Sudbury, Suffolk
- Appointed: between 789 and 793
- Term ended: c. 798
- Predecessor: Heardred
- Successor: Tidfrith

Orders
- Consecration: between 789 and 793

Personal details
- Died: c. 798
- Denomination: Christian

Ælfhun (or Ælphunus) was a medieval Bishop of Dunwich.

Ælfhun was consecrated between 789 and 793 and died about 798. The Anglo-Saxon Chronicle records that he died at Sudbury, Suffolk and his body was carried back to Dunwich for burial. A Portland stone statue of Ælfhun stands on The Croft at Sudbury, sculpted in 1999 by Alan Michlewaite.
