= Gyrwas =

Name of an Anglo-Saxon population of the Fens

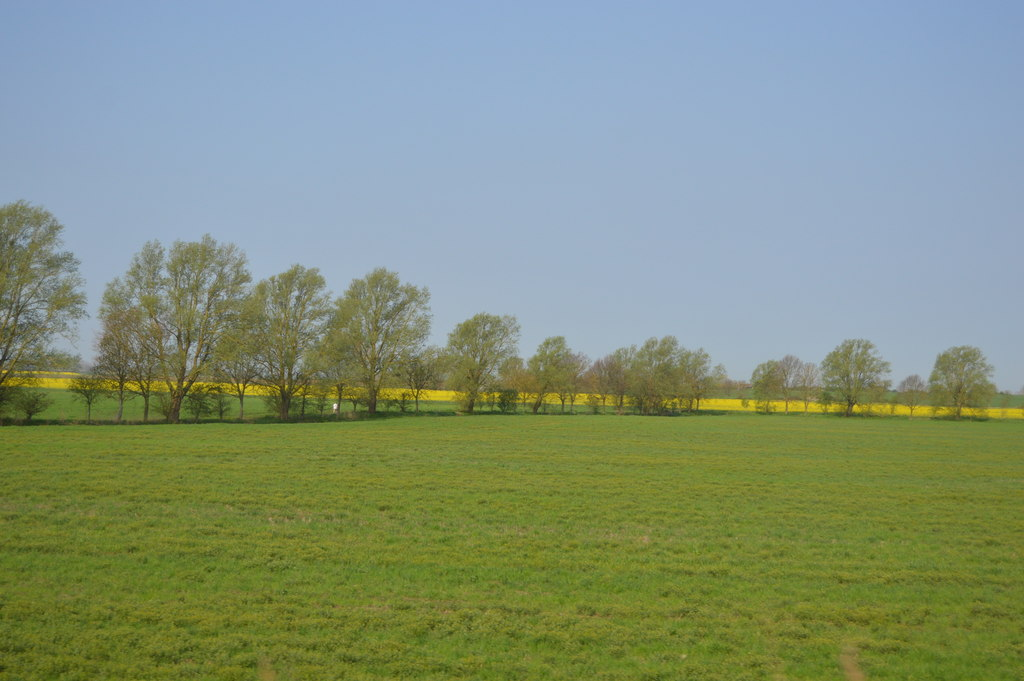
The Cambridgeshire Fens, home to the Gyrwas

Gyrwas was the name of an Anglo-Saxon tribe of the Fens, in modern-day Cambridgeshire, divided into northern and southern groups and recorded in the Tribal Hidage; related to the name of Jarrow. They were descended from the Angles, the Germanic tribe who settled in the East of England in the 5th and 6th centuries.

A map plotting the tribes featuring in the tribal hidage, including the North and South Gyrwas

Hugh Candidus, a twelfth-century chronicler of Peterborough Abbey, describes its foundation in the territory of the Gyrwas, under the name of Medeshamstede. Medeshamstede was clearly in the territory of the North Gyrwas. Hugh Candidus explains Gyrwas, which he uses in the present tense, as meaning people "who dwell in the fen, or hard by the fen, since a deep bog is called in the Saxon tongue Gyr". The territory of the South Gyrwas included Ely. Æthelthryth founded Ely monastery after the death of her husband Tondberht, who is described in Bede's Ecclesiastical History of the English People as a "prince of the South Gyrwas". Bede also described Thomas, Bishop of Dunwich, in East Anglia, as having been "from the province of the Gyrwas", and deacon to his predecessor, Felix of Burgundy.
