= Wilred =

9th-century Bishop of Dunwich

- Bishop of Dunwich
- Appointed: 825
- Term ended: between 845 and 870
- Predecessor: Waormund
- Successor: Æthelweald

Orders
- Consecration: 825

Personal details
- Died: between 845 and 870
- Denomination: Christian

Wilred (or Wilfredus) was a medieval Bishop of Dunwich.

Wilred was consecrated in 825 and died between 845 and 870.
