= Waormund =

9th-century Bishop of Dunwich

- Bishop of Dunwich
- Appointed: between 816 and 824
- Term ended: between 824 and 825
- Predecessor: Tidfrith
- Successor: Wilred

Orders
- Consecration: between 816 and 824

Personal details
- Died: between 824 and 825
- Denomination: Christian

Waormund (Note: Or Weremundus or Wærmund) was a medieval Bishop of Dunwich.

Waormund was consecrated between 816 and 824 and died between 824 and 825.
