= Abbot of Peterborough =

A list of the abbots of the abbey of Peterborough, known until the late 10th century as "Medeshamstede".

== Abbots ==
Name	Dates	Works	Notes
Sexwulf	c. 654– c. 676		Founder. Bishop of Mercia c. 676–?x692.
Cuthbald	c. 676		
Egbald	before 716		
Pusa			
Botwine	?x765– 779x?		
Beonna	?x789– 805x?		
Ceolred			
Hedda	870		
Ealdwulf	972-992		Archbishop of York, 995–1002.
Cenwulf	992-1006	Built wall around the abbey.	Bishop of Winchester, 1006.
Ælfsige	1006–1042		Accompanied Æthelred the Unready and Emma to Normandy in 1013.
Earnwig	1042–1052		A "very good man and very sincere", he "resigned although still in good health".
Leofric	1057–1066		Endowed the monastery "so that it became known as 'Golden Borough'".
Brand	1066–1069		
Turold of Fécamp	1069–1098		Viewed the abbey as a source of personal wealth for himself and his associates with his enfeoffments accounting for 46% of the abbey's property.
Godric	4 days in 1099		
Matthias	1103–1104		
Ernulf	1107–1114	Began a building campaign.	Bishop of Rochester, 1115. He was influential in restoring the abbey's finances.
John de Séez	1114–1125	Continued the building work and, though in 1116 a great fire caused considerable damage, rebuilding began in 1117.	
Abbey held by King Henry I	1125–1127		
Henry de Angeli	1128–1133	Did nothing towards the rebuilding.	He wasted the goods of the abbey and was banished.
Martin de Bec	1133–1155	Continued construction works.	Formerly a monk of Bec and prior of St Neots.
William of Waterville	1155–1175		Deposed
Benedict	1177–1194		Chronicler.
Andrew	1194–1199	West front.	
Acharius	1200–1210	West front.	
Robert of Lindsey	1214–1222		
Alexander of Holderness	1222–1226		
Martin of Ramsey	1226–1233		
Walter of Bury St. Edmunds	1233–1245	Abbot at the time of the building's final completion through the solemn dedication of the church on 6, October 1238.	
William of Hotoft	1246–1249		
John de Caux	1250–1262		
Robert of Sutton	1262–1273		
Richard of London	1274–1295		
William of Woodford	1295–1299		
Godfrey of Crowland	1299–1321	A chapel of St Thomas of Canterbury was built between the church and the Lady Chapel.	
Adam of Boothby	1321–1338		
Henry of Morcott	1338–1353		
Robert of Ramsey	1353–1361		
Henry of Overton	1361–1391		
Nicholas of Elmstow	1391–1396		
William Genge	1397–1408		
John Deeping	1409–1439		
Richard Ashton	1439–1471		
William Ramsey	1471–1496		
Robert Kirton	1496–1528	The latest part of the church, and the only ever enlargement of the eastern arm, the square ended building at the east known as "the new building".	
John Chambers	1528–1539		Rewarded for complicity during the Dissolution with being made first bishop of Peterborough - care for the former abbey church, which became the bishop's cathedral, passed to the dean of Peterborough.

== Sources ==
- 'Houses of Benedictine monks: The abbey of Peterborough', A History of the County of Northampton: Volume 2 (1906), pp. 83–95. http://www.british-history.ac.uk/report.asp?compid=40221. Date accessed: 29 May 2007.
- Peterborough Chronicle.
- Stenton, F.M., "Medeshamstede and its Colonies", in Stenton, D.M. (ed.), Preparatory to 'Anglo-Saxon England'being the collected Papers of Frank Merry Stenton, OUP, 1970.
