= Ecglaf =

8th-century Bishop of Dunwich

- Bishop of Dunwich
- In office: dates unknown
- Predecessor: Ealdbeorht I
- Successor: Eardwulf

Personal details
- Died: unknown
- Denomination: Christian

Ecglaf (or Eglasius) was a medieval Bishop of Dunwich.

Ecglaf was bishop in the 8th century, but it is not known exactly when he was consecrated or when he died.
