= Eardred =

8th-century Bishop of Dunwich

- Bishop of Dunwich
- Appointed: before 716
- Term ended: after 716
- Predecessor: Ascwulf
- Successor: Cuthwine

Orders
- Consecration: before 716

Personal details
- Died: after 716
- Denomination: Christian

Eardred was a medieval Bishop of Dunwich.

Eardred was consecrated sometime before 716 and died after that date.
