= Hugh Candidus =

English Benedictine monk and author (c.1095–c.1160)

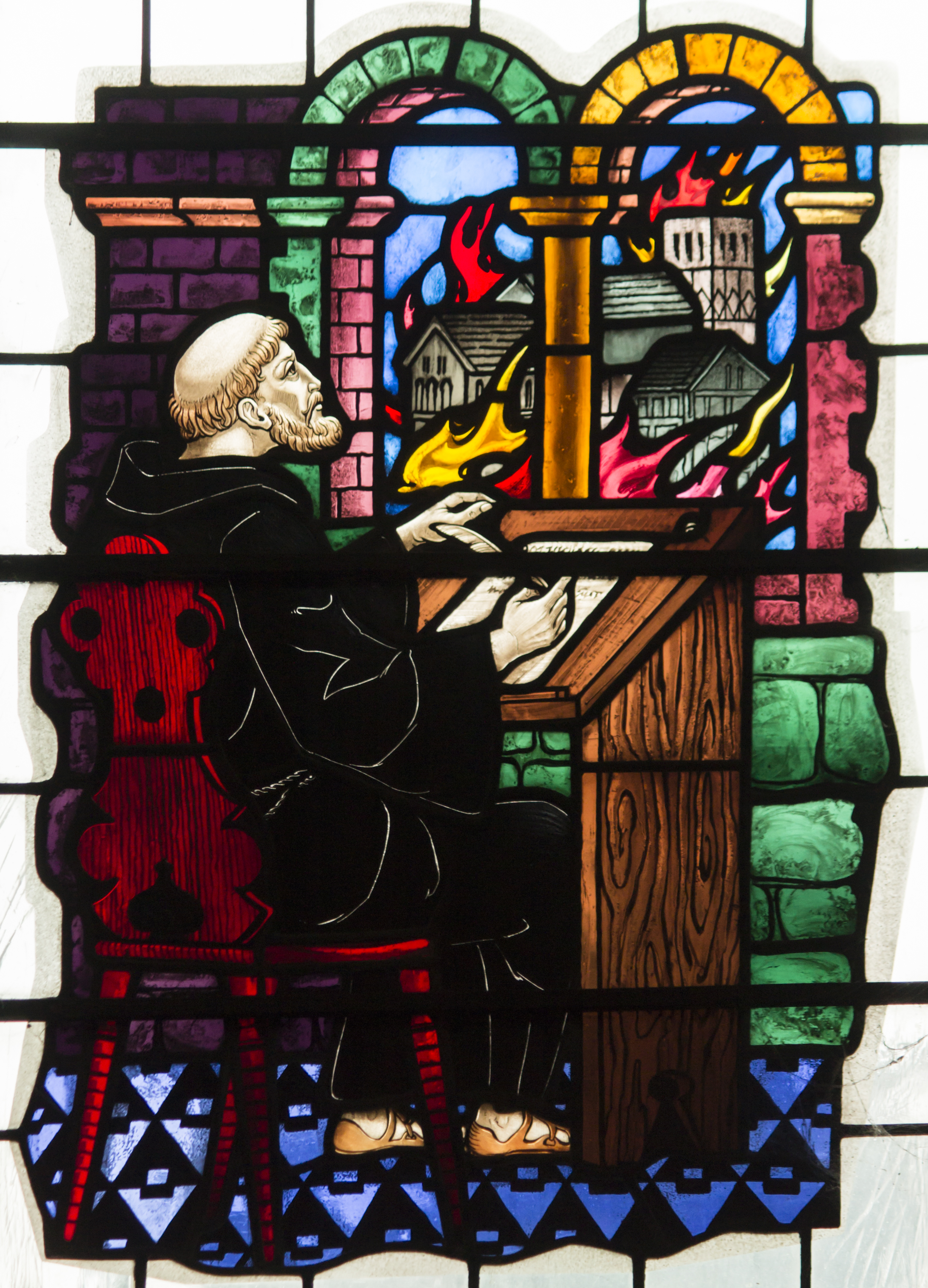
- Born: c. 1095
- Died: c. 1160 (aged 64–65)
- Other names: Hugh Albus; Hugo Albus; Hugh Whyte
- Occupation: monk
- Known for: History of Peterborough Abbey

Hugh Candidus (c. 1095 – c. 1160) was a monk of the Benedictine monastery at Peterborough, who wrote a Medieval Latin account of its history, from its foundation as Medeshamstede in the mid 7th century up to the mid 12th century.

== Life ==
Hugh Candidus was a monk of Peterborough Abbey from early boyhood. He was brought into the community by his elder brother, "Reinaldus Spiritus", or "Reginald Spirit", a sacrist there during Abbot Ernulf's tenure, 1107–1114. Hugh was a very sickly child, and, though he lived to a good age, he was never strong. He was called "Hugo Albus", meaning "Hugh White", from the paleness and beauty of his countenance; later writers called him "Hugo Candidus", "candidus" having a similar meaning to "albus". John Leland translated "Candidus" as if it were a surname, calling him "Hugh Whyte."

Hugh's chief teachers were Abbot Ernulf and his brother Reginald; he wrote of both in terms of warm affection later in his life. He remained a monk under the subsequent Peterborough abbots John, Henry, Martin of Bec, and William of Waterville. He won the affection of the monks and abbots, both as junior and senior, was equally popular in neighbouring monasteries and in the country around, and was employed in every branch of the business of the monastery, both internal and external. In Abbot Martin's time (1133–55), he was elected sub-prior. He was present when the church was burnt in 1116. At the subsequent reconsecration by Bishop Alexander of Lincoln, in Lent 1139, he kissed and washed the right arm of St. Oswald, the most precious of the relics kept at Peterborough. He bore testimony that the flesh and skin was still whole, in accordance with St. Aidan's prophecy. On the day of Martin's death, 2 January 1155, Hugh was appointed with eleven other senior monks, all of whom were junior to him, to form a committee for the election of the new abbot. They chose William of Waterville, one of their own house. The next day, Hugh was sent with the prior, Reginald, to announce the election to Henry II, whom they found at Oxford with Archbishop Theobald of Canterbury. Henry confirmed the election.

== Written work ==
Hugh wrote a history of Peterborough Abbey, in Medieval Latin, in which he describes its foundation as "Medeshamstede" in the 7th century; its refoundation by Bishop Æthelwold of Winchester in the 10th century, and the subsequent change of name to "Burh", or "Borough", which he gives in the Anglo-Norman form "Burch"; its growth in wealth prior to the Norman Conquest in 1066, as a result of which it is said to have become known as "the golden borough"; and he concludes with the election of Abbot William of Waterville. According to Prof. King, "Hugh's writings never stray far from the monastery, its fabric, and its endowment, and the saints who watched over it." Later, anonymous hands interpolated numerous additions, including references to Hugh's death, and a short account of the deposition of William of Waterville in 1175. It is conjectured that Hugh died soon after the election of Waterville.

It is sometimes thought that Hugh also wrote the concluding portions of the Peterborough Chronicle, a local version of the Anglo-Saxon Chronicle, which, like his history, comes abruptly to an end with Abbot William of Waterville's election. This has been rejected on the basis that, according to one writer, Hugh failed to understand the English of the Chronicle fully. However, while another writer has observed that Hugh "may well have been at least half Norman", according to the most recent editor of Hugh's history, it shows that "[Old English] was still understood in monastic circles in Peterborough in the mid-twelfth century, quite apart from the evidence afforded by the transcription of the [Peterborough Chronicle] there". Also, while the most recent editor of the Peterborough Chronicle considers it more likely that Hugh made use of the Chronicle, rather than the other way around, an earlier editor stated that "[all] the evidence there is" seems to be against identifying Hugh with the author of the Chronicle.

Hugh's Medieval Latin history of Peterborough Abbey was first published in 1723 by Joseph Sparke, in his Historiæ Anglicanæ Scriptores Variæ, edited from a 14th-century manuscript known as the "Book of Walter of Whittlesey". An abridged translation of parts into Norman-French verse is printed in the same collection, as well as a continuation up to 1246, both from another manuscript dating from the 1250s, which is now kept in the Manuscript Room of Cambridge University Library, and is called the "Book of Robert of Swaffham." However, the earliest surviving version of Hugh's history is in a transcript made in the 17th century, from a manuscript which was lost when part of the Cotton library was destroyed by fire in 1731. The most recent edition of Hugh's history, in which the three Medieval Latin versions are edited together so as to indicate their internal differences, is that of W.T. Mellows, which was published in 1949. An English translation by C. and W.T. Mellows, edited by W. T. Mellows, was first published in 1941, but a third, revised edition was published in 1980.

== Bibliography ==
- Clark, Cecily (1958), The Peterborough Chronicle 1070 - 1154, OUP, p. xxi
- Irvine, S., ed. (2004), The Anglo-Saxon Chronicle a Collaborative Edition 7 MS E, Brewer, p. ic, ISBN 9780859914949
- Martin, Janet D (1978), The Cartularies and Registers of Peterborough Abbey, Northamptonshire Record Society, pp. 7–8, 17–8
- Mellows, W. T., ed. (1949), The Chronicle of Hugh Candidus a Monk of Peterborough (Medieval Latin with English Introduction), OUP
- Mellows C (trans) (1980), Mellows, W T (ed.), The Peterborough Chronicle of Hugh Candidus (3 ed.), Peterborough Museum Society

Attribution

- This article incorporates text from a publication now in the public domain: Tout, Thomas Frederick (1891). "Hugh (fl.1107?-1155?)". In Lee, Sidney (ed.). Dictionary of National Biography. Vol. 28. London: Smith, Elder & Co. p. 163. The entry states:
  - The sole authority for Hugh's life is his own account of himself in his Historia Cœnobii Burgensis, pp. 34, 66, 67, 68-70, 90, the chronology of which can be adjusted by reference to the Peterborough Chronicle;
  - Gunton's Hist. of the Church of Peterborough;
  - Wright's Biog. Brit. Anglo-Norman Period, pp. 176–8;
  - Hardy's Descriptive Cat. of MS. Materials for British History, ii. 412-13.
