= Tidfrith of Dunwich =

8th and 9th-century Bishop of Dunwich

Tidfrith
- Bishop of Dunwich
- Appointed: 798
- Term ended: between 816 and 824
- Predecessor: Ælfhun
- Successor: Waormund

Orders
- Consecration: 798

Personal details
- Died: between 816 and 824
- Denomination: Christian

Tidfrith (also Tedfrid, Tidferth or Thefridus) was a medieval Bishop of Dunwich.

Tidfrith was consecrated in 798 and died between 816 and 824.
