= Ealdwulf (archbishop of York) =

Archbishop of York from 995 to 1002

- Archbishop of York
- Appointed: 995
- Term ended: 6 May 1002
- Predecessor: Oswald
- Successor: Wulfstan
- Other posts: Abbot of Peterborough; Bishop of Worcester

Orders
- Consecration: 995

Personal details
- Died: 6 May 1002

Ealdwulf (died 6 May 1002) was a medieval Abbot of Peterborough, Bishop of Worcester, and Archbishop of York.

== Life ==
Traditional stories state that Ealdwulf was a layman and chancellor to King Edgar of England when one night he accidentally smothered his son while sharing a bed with the child. Rather than go to Rome to seek absolution for this sin, which had been his original plan, Ealdwulf refounded the monastery at Medeshamstede, which later became known as Peterborough Abbey, on the advice of Æthelwold, bishop of Winchester. Ealdwulf then joined his new foundation as a monk before becoming abbot of Peterborough from about 966 to 992.

Ealdwulf was bishop of Worcester as well as archbishop of York from 995 to his death on 6 May 1002. While archbishop, he held a synod at Worcester around 1000 to consider moving the relics of Saint Oswald of Worcester.

Ealdwulf's reputation was one of extreme piety. William of Malmesbury compared him to his successor Wulfstan as follows "Ealdwulf can be pardoned for holding the two sees contrary to canon law because of his sanctity, and because he did it not through ambition but by necessity."

== Citations ==
Christian titles
Preceded by Oswald	Bishop of Worcester; 992–1002	Succeeded by Wulfstan
Preceded by Oswald	Archbishop of York; 995–1002	Succeeded by Wulfstan
