= Hayo Vierck =

German archaeologist

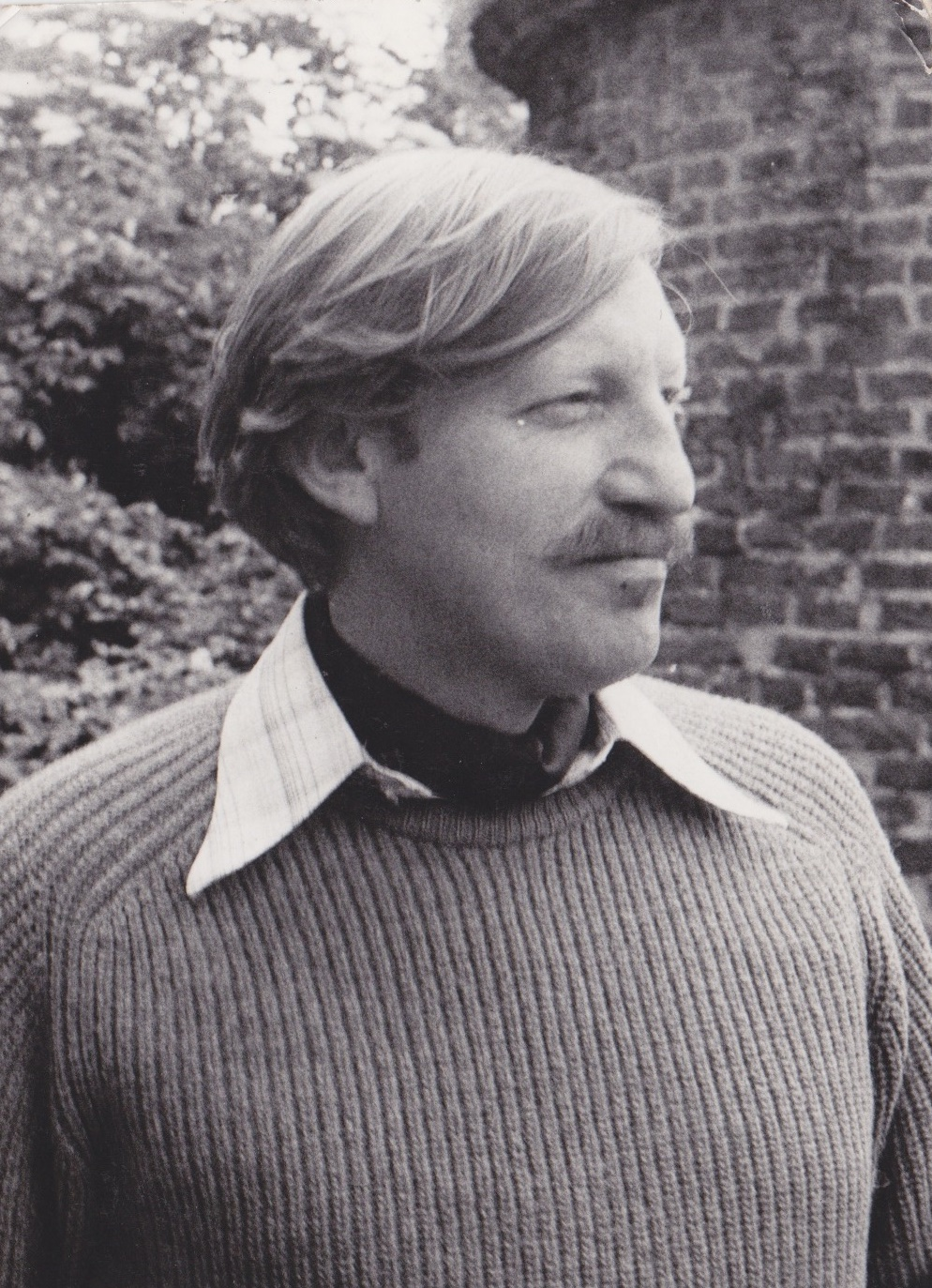
Hayo Vierck

Hayo Vierck (born 5 August 1939, Bentheim; d. 16 March 1989, Reichenau Island) was a German archaeologist, who made a distinguished contribution to German Early Medieval archaeology through research in the industrial arts.

== Career ==
Hayo Vierck took an early interest in the history and archaeology of his homeland while at secondary school, and also had early contact with Haithabu. After taking his school certificate examinations in 1962 in Plön, Vierck studied Pre- and Proto-history with the subsidiary subjects of Classical Archaeology and Folklore in Munich and obtained his doctorate in 1969 under Joachim Werner with a dissertation on North English and West Scandinavian Costume Accessories in the 5th and 6th Centuries. Finishing that, he undertook a second research project in Oxford, which culminated in his attainment of Bachelor of Letters (B. Litt.) in the Department of European Archaeology. He became Fellow of the External research unit 7 'Medieval research' of Münster University from 1969 until 1985, and Professor of 'Art and Craft in the Early Middle Ages' (Kunst und Handwerk im Frühmittelalter) at the Seminar for Protohistory and Early History. His special research strengths were his Work of Eligius and the Imitatio Imperii.

He was married to Sigrid Vierck, who wrote a dissertation on the Ægis, Die Aigis: Zu Typologie und Ikonographie eines Mythischen Gegenstandes and in 2008 was elected Abbess of the Lutheran conventual monastery of Walsrode Abbey.

== Writings ==
- Vierck, Hayo (December 1970). "Cortina Tripodis. Zu Aufhängung und Gebrauch subrömischer Hängebecken aus Britannien und Irland". Frühmittelalterliche Studien. 4. Münster: 8–52. doi:10.1515/9783110242041.8. S2CID 188786864.
- Thorsten Capelle and Hayo Vierck, 'Modeln der Merowinger- und Wikingerzeit', Frühmittelalterliche Studien 5, 1971, p. 42–100.
- Hayo Vierck, 'Redwalds Äsche', Offa 29 (1972), p. 20–49.
- Davies, Wendy & Vierck, Hayo (December 1974). "The Contexts of Tribal Hidage: Social Aggregates and Settlement Patterns". Frühmittelalterliche Studien. 2: 223–302. doi:10.1515/9783110242072.223. S2CID 201729051.
- Hayo Vierck, 'Werke des Eligius', in Kossack, Georg und Günter Ulbert (Eds.): Studien zur vor- und frühgeschichtlichen Archäologie. Festschrift für Joachim Werner. Münchener Beiträge zur Vor- und Frühgeschichte, 1974, p. 309–81.
- Thorsten Capelle and Hayo Vierck, 'Weitere Modeln der Merowinger-und Wikingerzeit. Mit einem Beitrag von Wilhelm Winkelmann', Fruhmittelalterliche Studien 9, 1975, p. 110–42.
- Hayo Vierck, 'Die wikingische Frauentracht von Birka', Offa 36, 1981, pp. 119–33.
- Hayo Vierck, Der Neufund aus einem frühmittelalterlichen Kirchenschatz von Enger in Westfalen. (Landschaftsverband Westfalen-Lippe, 1985).
- Hayo Vierck, 'Imitatio imperii und Interpretatio Germanica vor der Vikingerzeit', in Rudolf Zeitler (Ed.),Les pays du nord et Byzance: (Scandinavie et Byzance); actes du Colloque Nordique et International de Byzantinologie tenu à Upsal 20-22 avril 1979, (Uppsala 1981), p. 64–101.
- Hayo Vierck, 'Ein Schmiedeplatz aus Alt-Ladoga und der präurbane Handel zur Ostsee vor der Wikingerzeit' Zur frühmittelalterlichen Betriebseinheit von produktion und Absatz im Metallhandwerk, (Münstersche Beiträge zur Antiken Handelgeschichte), Vol. 2, No. 2, 1983, p. 3–64 ISSN 0722-4532.
- Hayo Vierck, 'Hallenfreude. Archäologische Spuren frühmittelalterlicher Trinkgelage und mögliche Wege der Deutung', in Detlef Altenburg, Jörg Jarnut and Hans-Hugo Steinhoff (Eds.), Feste und Feiern im Mittelalter. Paderborner Symposion des Mediävistenverbandes, (1991) p. 115–24.
- Kurt Schietzel, Hayo Vierck, Miriam Koktvedgaard Zeitzen and Barbara R. Armbruster, Berichte über die Ausgrabungen in Haithabu, Vol.34, Wachholtz, January 1, 2002.
- Hayo Vierck, 'Wieland der Schmied – und Schamane? Ein Schmiedeheld und Halbgott im Spiegel skandinavischer und angelsächsischer Bilddenkmäler', (Walter de Gruyter) 2021-2022, ISBN 978-3-11-048604-9.

== Sources ==
- Volker Bierbrauer 'Nachruf auf Hayo Vierck', in Frühmittelalterliche Studien 23 (1989), p. 478–85.
- Helmut Roth, 'Hayo Vierck 1939-1989', Praehistorische Zeitung 64 (1989), p. 159–63.
- Volker Bierbrauer, 'Siegrid Vierck: Schriftenverzeichnis Dr. phil. Hayo Vierck, B. Litt. Oxon..', Prähistorische Zeitschrift 64 (1989), p. 160–163.
- Partick Périn, 'A la memoire de Hayo Ernst Ferdinand Vierck (1939–1989)', Actes des Xe Journées Internationales d'Archéologie Mérovingienne, (Metz 1994), p. 5–6 (with portrait)
- The Hayo Vierk archive has been deposited since 2005 in the Roman-Germanic Central Museum in Mainz.
