= Cuthwine of Dunwich =

8th-century Bishop of Dunwich

Cuthwine
- Bishop of Dunwich
- In office: dates unknown
- Predecessor: Eardred
- Successor: Ealdbeorht I

Personal details
- Died: unknown
- Denomination: Christian

Cuthwine (or Cuthwynus) was a medieval bishop of Dunwich in England.

Cuthwine was bishop around the years of 716 and 731, but it is not known exactly when he was consecrated or his date of death.

He is known to have acquired at least two illustrated Italian manuscripts of Christian Latin poets.
