= Heardred of Dunwich =

8th-century Bishop of Dunwich

Heardred
- Bishop of Dunwich
- Appointed: before 781
- Term ended: between 789 and 793
- Predecessor: Eardwulf
- Successor: Ælfhun

Orders
- Consecration: before 781

Personal details
- Died: between 789 and 793
- Denomination: Christian

Heardred was a medieval Bishop of Dunwich.

Heardred was consecrated before 781 and died between 789 and 793.
