= Acca of Dunwich =

7th-century Bishop of Dunwich

Acca
- Bishop of Dunwich
- Appointed: after 672
- Term ended: unknown
- Predecessor: new foundation
- Successor: Ascwulf

Orders
- Consecration: after 672

Personal details
- Died: not known
- Denomination: Christian

Æcci or Acca of Dunwich, was a medieval bishop of Dunwich. He was consecrated after 672, however, his death or end of episcopate is not known.
