= Eardwulf (bishop of Dunwich) =

8th-century Bishop of Dunwich

- Bishop of Dunwich
- Appointed: before 747
- Term ended: after 747
- Predecessor: Ecglaf
- Successor: Heardred

Orders
- Consecration: before 747

Personal details
- Died: after 747
- Denomination: Christian

Eardwulf (or Heardwulf) was a medieval Bishop of Dunwich.

Eardwulf was consecrated sometime before 747 and died after that date.
