= Ealdbeorht I =

8th-century Bishop of Dunwich

- Bishop of Dunwich
- Appointed: before 731
- Term ended: after 731
- Predecessor: Cuthwine
- Successor: Ecglaf

Orders
- Consecration: before 731

Personal details
- Died: after 731
- Denomination: Christian

Ealdbeorht (or Alberht) was a medieval Bishop of Dunwich.

Ealdbeorht was consecrated sometime before 731 and died after that date.
