= Winfrith (bishop) =

7th-century Bishop of Mercia

- Bishop of Lichfield
- Appointed: 672
- Term ended: deposed between 672 and 676
- Predecessor: Chad of Mercia
- Successor: Seaxwulf

Orders
- Consecration: 672

Winfrith (Note: Winfred, Winfrede or Wynfrith) was a medieval Bishop of Lichfield.

Winfrith was consecrated in 672 and deprived of his see between 672 and 676. He was deposed by Archbishop Theodore of Canterbury for disobedience.

== Citations ==
Christian titles
Preceded by Chad of Mercia	Bishop of Lichfield; 672–c. 675	Succeeded by Seaxwulf
