= Peterborough Chronicle =

Manuscript which contains unique information about the history of England

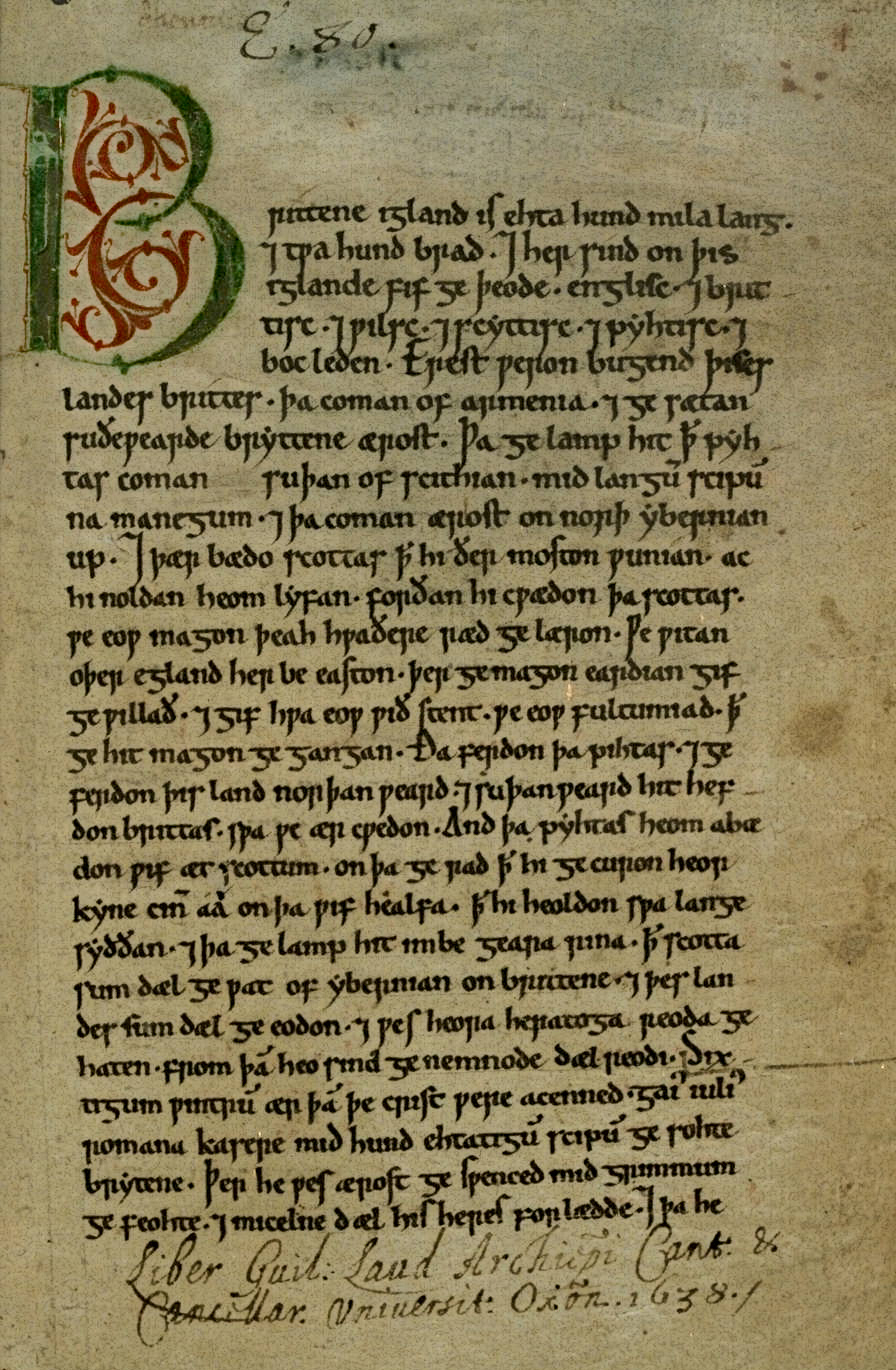
The opening page of the Laud Manuscript. The scribal hand is the copyist's work rather than either the First or Second continuation scribes. Translation of this scanned page.

The Peterborough Chronicle (also called the Laud manuscript and the E manuscript) is a version of the Anglo-Saxon Chronicle originally maintained by the monks of Peterborough Abbey, now in Cambridgeshire. It contains unique information about the history of England and of the English language after the Norman Conquest; according to philologist J. A. W. Bennett, it is the only prose history in English between the Conquest and the later 14th century.

The Anglo-Saxon Chronicles were composed and maintained between the various monasteries of Anglo-Saxon England and were an attempt to record the history of Britain throughout the years AD. Typically the chronicles began with the birth of Christ, went through Biblical and Roman history, then continued to the present. Every major religious house in England kept its own, individual chronicle, and the chronicles were not compared with each other or in any way kept uniform. For example, in the opening paragraph of this chronicle it is said that the Britons that settled in South Britain came from "Armenia". ("Armenia" is probably a mistaken transcription of Armorica, an area in Northwestern Gaul.) However, whenever a monastery's chronicle was damaged, or when a new monastery began a chronicle, nearby monasteries would lend out their chronicles for copying. Thus, a new chronicle would be identical to the lender's until they reached the date of copying and then would be idiosyncratic. Such was the case with the Peterborough Chronicle: a fire compelled the abbey to copy the chronicles from other churches up to 1120.

When William the Conqueror took England and Anglo-Norman became the official language, the Anglo-Saxon Chronicles generally ceased. The monks of Peterborough Abbey, however, continued to compile events in theirs. While the Peterborough Chronicle is not professional history, and one still needs Latin histories (e.g. William of Malmesbury's Gesta Regum Anglorum), it is one of the few surviving first-hand accounts from the period 1070 to 1154 in England written in English and from a non-courtly point of view.

It is also a valuable source of information about the early Middle English language itself. The first continuation, for example, is written in late Old English, but the second continuation begins to show mixed forms, until the conclusion of the second continuation, which switches into an early form of distinctly Middle English. The linguistic novelties recorded in the second continuation are plentiful, including at least one true innovation: the feminine pronoun "she" (as "scæ") is first recorded in the Peterborough Chronicle (Bennett 1986).

The chronicle from the original copied text through the continuations shows the history of the loss of grammatical gender in West Saxon English, going from the copied portion which while mostly conforming to Old English grammatical gender does have some discrepancies, through the first continuation in which modifiers are re-adapted to other functions and there is a large discrepancy with Old English grammatical gender, to the second continuation in which grammatical gender is completely lost or nearly so.

== The fire and the continuations ==
Today, the Peterborough Chronicle is recognised as one of the four distinct versions of the Anglo-Saxon Chronicle (along with the Winchester Chronicle or Parker Chronicle, the Abingdon Chronicle and the Worcester Chronicle), but it is not wholly distinct (Bennett & Smithers 1989). There was a fire at Peterborough (Friday, 4 August 1116) that destroyed the monastery's library, and so the earliest part of the Anglo-Saxon Chronicle at Peterborough is a copy of Winchester Cathedral's chronicle (Ramsay 1898). For the 11th century, the chronicle at Peterborough diverges from Parker's, and it has been speculated that a proto-"Kentish Chronicle", full of nationalistic and regionalistic interests, was used for these years; however, such a single source is speculative (Ward & Trent 1907–21). The Peterborough copyists probably used multiple sources for their missing years, but the Dissolution of the Monasteries makes it impossible to be sure. Regardless, the entries for the 12th century to 1122 are a jumble of other chronicles' accounts, sharing half-entries with one source and half with another, moving from one source to another and then back to a previous one. This shifting back and forth raises, again, the vexatious possibility of a lost chronicle as a single, common source.

It is after 1122 that the Peterborough manuscript becomes unique. Therefore, the document usually called The Peterborough Chronicle is divided into the "first continuation" and the "second continuation" from the time of the fire and the copying. The two continuations are sui generis both in terms of the information they impart, the style they employ, and their language. The first continuation covers 1122–1131. The second continuation runs from 1132 to 1154 and includes the reign of King Stephen.

The copied portion uses grammatical gender and inflections like in Old English, but there are discrepancies.

=== First continuation (1122–1131) ===
Although the second continuation holds the most importance, the first continuation has unique records of events in the Peterborough area and provides an insight into ordinary people's lives. The first continuation records the Conquest, the incursion of Sweyn of Denmark, and rumours of other turbulence about the throne. However, it has no evidence at all for Saxon opposition and rebellion against William and his sons. An arguably eyewitness account describes the burning of Peterborough Abbey itself, due to the drunkenness of the monks. It also covers ecclesiastical scandals, such as the Abbot of Glastonbury bringing in mercenaries to control his religious house. Further, there is a significant change in language from the previous late Old English that begins with the entry for the years 1122–1131, with mixtures of Old English and Middle English vocabulary (and increasing Gallic formations) and syntax (a simplification of the pronouns and strong verbs, as well as a decrease in the declensions of the nouns).

Both the first and second continuation authors have sympathy for the common man. As Bennett suggests, Peterborough is the one source for compassion of the laity found in contemporary accounts. The first continuation expresses as much outrage at the hanging of forty-four thieves in 1122, some of whom were innocent, as at the burning of the monastery at Gloucester. The monastic author suggests that taxes were too high, putting the impoverished villagers in a dilemma of stealing or starving. Therefore, the nobles were guilty of a double sin. First, they executed the innocent and used excessive cruelty with the guilty. Second, it was at least as sinful for the nobles to compel theft with their avarice as for the poor to steal for bread. When the Norman king, Henry I of England foisted his kinsman upon Peterborough as abbot (he was already abbot of Saint-Jean d'Angély), the chronicler protests at some length at the illegality and impiety of the appointment. He also mentions that the Wild Hunt was seen at the same time as the appointment, as an ill omen. When Henry was eventually removed by death, the monk again takes the position that this was divine remedy, for Henry had tried to make Peterborough part of the Cluniac Order and had attempted to have his own nephew be the next abbot, "oc Crist it ne uuolde" ("but Christ did not will it").

The first continuation shows a major change in grammatical gender and inflections from how they were used in Old English. Though there are still three genders - masculine, feminine, and neuter - several nouns seem to have been shuffled among the categories in a manner that cannot be completely explained by a move towards natural gender or the gender of French nouns, as the inflections marking gender are re-purposed for other functions.

=== Second continuation (1132–1154) ===
The "softe and god" King Stephen, or Stephen of Blois, whom the Peterborough author blames for The Anarchy.

The second, or final, continuation is remarkable for being in one authorial voice, and it relates the events of The Anarchy in England. Scholars speculate that the second continuation is dictated (because the language may reflect a version of early Middle English that scholars place later than Stephen and Matilda) or written as the recollections of a single elderly monk. It is a highly moving account of torture, fear, confusion, and starvation.

Henry I died in 1135, and Stephen and Matilda both had a claim to the throne. The monastic author describes the rebellion of the barons against Stephen, the escape of Matilda, and the tortures that the soldiers of the baronial powers inflicted upon the people. The author blames Stephen for the Anarchy for being "soft and good" when firmness and harshness were needed. When Stephen captured the rebelling barons, he let them go if they swore allegiance. According to the author,

"Þa the suikes undergæton ðat he milde man was and softe and god, and na iustise ne dide, þa diden hi alle wunder" (1137)

("When the traitors understood that he (Stephen) was a gentle man, and soft and good, and did not execute justice, they committed all manner of atrocity.")

The barons then attempted to raise money as quickly as they could. They needed money and manpower to build castles (which the author regards as novel and rare), and so they robbed everyone they met:

"æuric rice man his castles makede and agænes him heolden; and fylden þe land ful of castles. Hi suencten suyðe þe uurecce men of þe land mid castelweorces; þa þe castles uuaren maked, þa fylden hi mid deoules and yuele men. Þa namen hi þa men þe hi wendan ðat ani god hefden, bathe be nihtes and be dæies, carlmen and wimmen, and diden heom in prisun and pined heom efter gold and syluer untellendlice pining; for ne uuaeren naeure nan martyrs swa pined alse hi waeron."

("Every chieftain made castles and held them against the king; and they filled the land full of castles. They viciously oppressed the poor men of the land with castle-building work; when the castles were made, then they filled the land with devils and evil men. Then they seized those who had any goods, both by night and day, working men and women, and threw them into prison and tortured them for gold and silver with uncountable tortures, for never was there a martyr so tortured as these men were.")

The monastic author sympathises with the average farmer and artisan and talks about the devastation suffered by the countryside. He is outraged by the accounts of torture he relates and laments,

"Me henged up bi the fet and smoked heom mid ful smoke. Me henged bi the þumbes other bi the hefed and hengen bryniges on her fet. Me dide cnotted strenges abuton here hæued and uurythen it ðat it gæde to þe haernes… I ne can ne I ne mai tellen alle þe wunder ne all þe pines ðat he diden wrecce men on þis land."

("One they hung by his feet and filled his lungs with smoke. One was hung up by the thumbs and another by the head and had coats of mail hung on his feet. One they put a knotted cord about his head and twisted it so that it went into the brains ... I neither can nor may recount all the atrocities nor all the tortures that they did on the wretched men of this land.")

Death and famine followed, as the farms were depleted and farmers murdered. If two or three riders came to a village, the monk said, everyone fled, for fear that they were robbers. Trade therefore came to a standstill, and those in want had no way to get supplies. Those travelling with money to purchase food would be robbed or killed along the way. The barons said that there was no God. The chronicler records that people said openly that Christ slept, along with His saints; he states that "this — and more than we can say — we suffered 19 winters for our sins."

After the account of The Anarchy, the chronicler goes on to church matters. He speaks of the abbot Martin, who replaced the illegitimate Henry, as a good abbot. Martin had a new roof put on the monastery and moved the monks into a new building. He also, according to the author, recovered certain monastic lands that had been previously held "by force" by noblemen. Which lands these are is unclear, but they had probably been claimed by the nobles through the practice of placing younger sons in monasteries, making and revoking gifts of land, and by some early form of chantry. The Chronicle ends with a new abbot entering upon the death of Martin, an abbot named William. This abbot presumably halted the writing of the Chronicle.

Grammatical gender is almost completely gone, though Jones notes some authors consider the word that to still function as a neuter definite article here.

== Unique authorial voice ==
The two Peterborough continuations sympathise with the poor, and this makes them almost unique in Latin or English history. They also focus more on life outside of the abbey than other Chronicles. The general Chronicle is somewhat insular. While most versions note the national events, such as a progress of the king or a change in sovereign, discussion of the countryside around the monastery is limited. Portents and omens receive coverage, but rarely do the chroniclers discuss political alliances (as the author of the second continuation does with his denunciation of the bishops who were allied with Matilda) or the legalities of monastic rule (as the author of the first continuation does in his lament over Abbot Henry). The monks who compiled the continuation at Peterborough were either consciously striking out in a new direction (perhaps under the direction of Abbot Martin) or continuing a type of chronicle that was confined to their own monastery (that was lost with the fire). It does not seem likely that Peterborough was in any sense a lax or secular monastery, as the description of drunkenness causing the fire would not have made the abbey singular in the age.

The continuations are also unique in their linguistic shifts. When copying from Winchester, they preserve the orthography and syntax of late Old English, and when they get to events for which they have no copy text the language abruptly changes to a newer form. Given that the loan would have taken place just before the continuation, the change in language reflects either a dramatic attempt at greater vernacular by the continuation authors or a significant and quick change in the language itself as Norman influences spread. Because the chronicle is in prose, the artificiality of verse form does not entail the preservation of linguistic archaisms, and historians of English can trace the beginnings of Middle English in these pages.

== History of the manuscript ==
The manuscript of the Chronicle is now held by the Bodleian Library. It was donated to the library by William Laud, who was then Chancellor of Oxford University as well as Archbishop of Canterbury, on 28 June 1639. Laud included the manuscript together with a number of other documents, part of the third of a series of donations he made to the library in the years leading up to the English Civil War. It is currently identified in the library catalogue as Laud Misc. 636; previously it was designated as O. C. 1003 based on the "Old Catalogue" by Edward Bernard. The Bodleian has made a series of images of Laud Misc 636 available.
