= 840 =

Calendar year

840 in various calendars
- Gregorian calendar: 840; DCCCXL
- Ab urbe condita: 1593
- Armenian calendar: 289; ԹՎ ՄՁԹ
- Assyrian calendar: 5590
- Balinese saka calendar: 761–762
- Bengali calendar: 246–247
- Berber calendar: 1790
- Buddhist calendar: 1384
- Burmese calendar: 202
- Byzantine calendar: 6348–6349
- Chinese calendar: 己未年 (Earth Goat); 3537 or 3330 — to — 庚申年 (Metal Monkey); 3538 or 3331
- Coptic calendar: 556–557
- Discordian calendar: 2006
- Ethiopian calendar: 832–833
- Hebrew calendar: 4600–4601
- Hindu calendars
- Vikram Samvat: 896–897
- Shaka Samvat: 761–762
- Kali Yuga: 3940–3941
- Holocene calendar: 10840
- Iranian calendar: 218–219
- Islamic calendar: 225–226
- Japanese calendar: Jōwa 7 (承和７年)
- Javanese calendar: 737–738
- Julian calendar: 840; DCCCXL
- Korean calendar: 3173
- Minguo calendar: 1072 before ROC 民前1072年
- Nanakshahi calendar: −628
- Seleucid era: 1151/1152 AG
- Thai solar calendar: 1382–1383
- Tibetan calendar: ས་མོ་ལུག་ལོ་ (female Earth-Sheep); 966 or 585 or −187 — to — ལྕགས་ཕོ་སྤྲེ་ལོ་ (male Iron-Monkey); 967 or 586 or −186

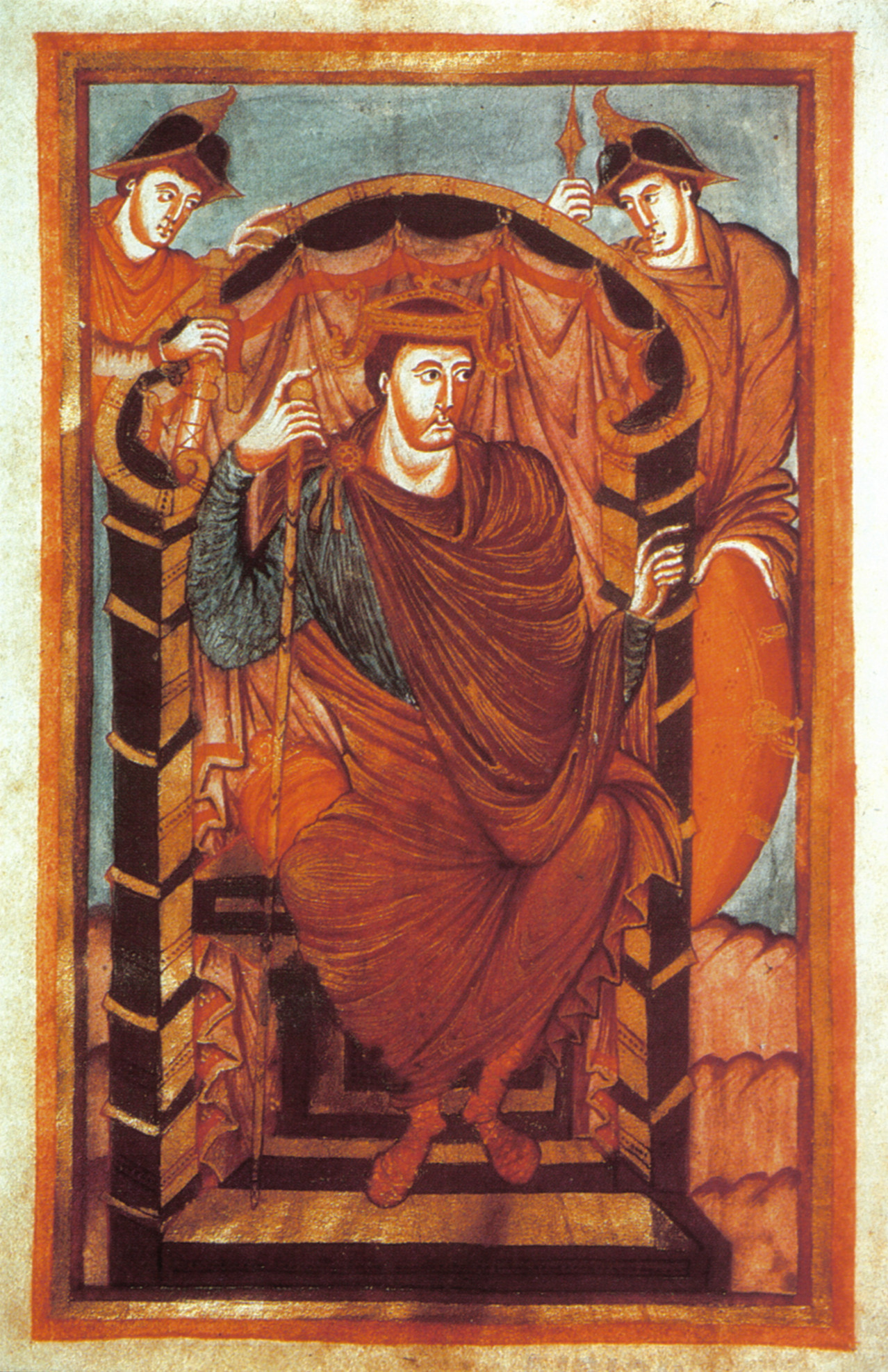
Emperor Lothair I (reigns 840–855)

Year 840 (DCCCXL) was a leap year starting on Thursday in the Julian calendar, the 840th year of the Common Era (CE) and Anno Domini (AD) designations, the 840th year of the 1st millennium, the 40th year of the 9th century, and the 1st year of the 840s decade.

== Events ==
=== By place ===
==== Europe ====
- June 20 – Louis the Pious, Emperor of the Romans and King of the Franks, falls ill and dies at his hunting lodge, on an island in the Rhine, near the Ingelheim Imperial Palace in Francia, while suppressing a revolt. He proclaims his eldest son Lothair I as his successor as Emperor. Lothair tries to seize all the territories of his late grandfather Charlemagne. Louis' son by his second wife, Charles, 17, becomes King of the Franks, and joins with his half-brother Louis the German in resisting Lothair.

==== British Isles ====
- King Wigstan of Mercia in England, grandson of former ruler Wiglaf (d. 839), declines his kingship in preference of the religious life. He asks his widowed mother, Princess Ælfflæd, to act as regent. A nobleman of the line of the late king Beornred, named Berhtric, wishes to marry her but, as he is a relative, Wigstan refuses the match, and is murdered by followers of Berhtric at Wistow, Leicestershire. He is buried at Repton Abbey, and later revered as a saint. The Mercian throne is seized by Berhtric's father, Beorhtwulf.
- Vikings from Norway capture Dublin and establish a Norse kingdom in Ireland, and also at about this date make their first overwintering at Lough Neagh in the north of Ireland.

==== Asia ====
- February 10 – Chinese Tang dynasty Emperor Wenzong (Li Ang) dies after a 13-year reign. Through the intervention of his powerful palace eunuchs, he is succeeded by his brother Wuzong.
- June – The 840 Erzurum earthquake takes place in the city of Qaliqala (modern-day Erzurum in Turkey) (probable date).
- The Yenisei Kirghiz settle along the Yenisei River, and sack with a force of around 80,000 horsemen the Uyghur capital, Ordu-Baliq (driving the Uyghurs out of Mongolia). This ends the Uyghur Khaganate.

=== By topic ===
==== Religion ====
- Nobis becomes bishop of St. David's, in the Welsh Kingdom of Dyfed (approximate date).

==== Historiography ====
- Completion in Japan of the Nihon Kōki, third book of the Rikkokushi. This includes the earliest record of cherry blossom at the Imperial Court in Kyoto (in 812) and of tea brought from China and served to the Emperor (in 815).

== Births ==
- January – Michael III, Byzantine emperor (d. 867) (most probable date: 839 is also possible)
- October 25 – Ya'qub ibn al-Layth al-Saffar, founder of the Saffarid dynasty (d. 879)
- Abu al-Hassan al-Nuri, Muslim Sufi (approximate date)
- Adalhard of Metz, Frankish nobleman (approximate date)
- Berengaudus, Benedictine monk (d. 892)
- Clement of Ohrid, Bulgarian scholar (approximate date)
- Eudokia Ingerina, Byzantine empress (approximate date)
- Hucbald, Frankish music theorist (or 850)
- Lothar I, Count of Stade, Frankish nobleman (d. 880)
- Notker the Stammerer, Swiss Benedictine monk and scholar (approximate date)
- Richardis, Frankish empress (approximate date)
- Sunyer II, Count of Empúries, Frankish nobleman (approximate date)
- Theodard, archbishop of Narbonne (approximate date)
- Theodore II, Roman pope of the Catholic Church for 20 days (d. 897)
- Unruoch III, margrave of Friuli (approximate date)

== Deaths ==
- February 10 – Emperor Wenzong of Tang, Chinese ruler (b. 809)
- March 14 – Einhard, Frankish scholar
- June 1 – Wigstan, king of Mercia, murdered (probable date)
- June 11 – Emperor Junna, ruler of Japan (b. 785)
- June 16 or 839 – Rorgon I, Frankish nobleman
- June 20 – Louis the Pious, ruler of the Carolingian Empire (b. 778)
- Agobard, archbishop of Lyon (b. 779)
- Andrew II, duke of Naples
- Ansovinus, archbishop of Camerino
- Czimislav, king of the Sorbs (approximate date)
- He Jintao, Chinese general of the Tang dynasty
- Hilduin, archbishop of Paris (b. 775)
- Li Chengmei, Chinese prince of the Tang dynasty, forced suicide
- Li Rong, Chinese prince of the Tang dynasty, forced suicide
- Muhammad at-Taqi, Muslim 9th Ismā'īlī imam (or 839)
- Qasar Qaghan, 12th ruler of the Uyghur Khaganate, killed
- Salmawaih ibn Bunan, Muslim physician
- Yang, consort and concubine of Chinese Emperor Wenzong, forced suicide
