= List of monarchs of Mercia =

The Kingdom of Mercia was a state in the English Midlands from the 6th century to the 10th century. For some two hundred years from the mid-7th century onwards it was the dominant member of the Heptarchy and consequently the most powerful of the Anglo-Saxon kingdoms. During this period its rulers became the first English monarchs to assume such wide-ranging titles as King of Britain and King of the English.

Spellings varied widely in this period, even within a single document, and a number of variants exist for the names given below. For example, the sound th was usually represented with the Old English letters ð or þ.

For the Continental predecessors of the Mercians in Angeln, see List of kings of the Angles. For their successors see List of English monarchs.

== Kings of the Mercians ==
The traditional rulers of Mercia were known as the Iclingas, descendants of the kings of the Angles. When the Iclingas became extinct in the male line, a number of other families, labelled B, C and W by historians, competed for the throne.

Iclingas
B-dynasty (so-called – a conjectural grouping based on names alone)
C-dynasty (traditionally a branch of the Iclingas, probably instead descended from the West Saxon king Cenwalh and his Iclinga wife)
W-dynasty (Wiglaf and his descendants, later intermarried with C)
Unknown dynastic affiliation
Mercia under external occupation
Æthelred II and family (recognising West Saxon overlordship)

All the following are kings, unless specified. Those in italics are probably legendary, are of dubious authenticity, or may not have reigned.

Ruler	Reign	Biographical notes	Died
Icel	c. 515-c.535	Son of Eomer, last King of the Angles in Angeln. Led his people across the North Sea to Britain.	c.535
Cnebba	c. 535-c.554	Son of Icel of Mercia	c.554
Cynewald	c. 554-c.584	Son of Cnebba.	c.584
Creoda	c. 584–c. 593	Son of Cynewald. Probable founder of the Mercian royal fortress at Tamworth.	c. 593
Pybba	c. 593–c. 606	Son of Creoda. Extended Mercian control into the western Midlands.	c. 606
Cearl	c. 606–c. 626	Named as king by Bede, not included in later regnal lists.	c. 626
Penda	c. 626–655	Son of Pybba. Raised Mercia to dominant status amongst the Anglo-Saxon kingdoms. Last pagan ruler of Mercia. Killed in battle by Oswiu of Northumbria.	15 Nov 655
Eowa	c. 635–642	Son of Pybba. Co-ruler. Killed in battle.	5 Aug 642
Peada	c. 653–656	Son of Penda. Co-ruler in the south-east Midlands. Murdered.	17 Apr 656
Oswiu of Northumbria	655–658	Briefly took direct control of Mercia after the death of Penda. Also King of Northumbria (655–670).	15 Feb 670
Wulfhere	658–675	Son of Penda. Restored Mercian dominance in England. First Christian king of all Mercia.	675
Æthelred I	675–704	Son of Penda. Abdicated and retired to a monastery at Bardney.	716
Cœnred	704–709	Son of Wulfhere. Abdicated and retired to Rome.	?
Ceolred	709–716	Son of Æthelred I. Probably poisoned.	716
Ceolwald	716	Presumed son of Æthelred I (may not have existed).	716
Æthelbald	716–757	Grandson of Eowa. Proclaimed himself King of Britain in 736. Murdered by his bodyguards.	757
Beornred	757	No known relation to his predecessors. Deposed by Offa.	?
Offa	757–796	Great-great-grandson of Eowa. The greatest and most powerful of all Mercian kings, he proclaimed himself King of the English in 774, built Offa's Dyke, and introduced the silver penny.	29 Jul 796
Ecgfrith	787–796	Son of Offa. Co-ruler, died suddenly a few months after his father.	17 Dec 796
Cœnwulf	796–821	Seventh generation descendant of Pybba, probably through a sister of Penda. Assumed the title of 'emperor'.	821
Cynehelm	c. 798–812	Son of Cœnwulf. Although he existed, his status as co-ruler and his murder are legendary. Canonised (St Kenelm).	812
Ceolwulf I	821–823	Brother of Cœnwulf. Deposed by Beornwulf.	?
Beornwulf	823–826	Conjectured kinsman of Beornred. Killed in battle against the East Anglians.	826
Ludeca	826–827	No known relation to his predecessors. Killed in battle against the East Anglians.	827
Wiglaf (1st reign)	827–829	No known relation to his predecessors. Deposed by Ecgberht of Wessex.	839
Ecgberht of Wessex	829–830	Briefly took direct control of Mercia after the deposition of Wiglaf. Also King of Wessex (802–839).	4 Feb 839
Wiglaf (2nd reign)	830–839	Restored. Although Mercia regained its independence, its dominance in England was lost.	839
Wigmund	c. 839–c. 840	Son of Wiglaf and son-in-law of Ceolwulf I. Probably co-ruler.	c. 840
Wigstan	840	Son of Wigmund. Declined the kingship and was later murdered by Beorhtwulf. Canonised (St Wystan).	849
Ælfflæd (Queen)	840	Daughter of Ceolwulf I, wife of Wigmund and mother of Wigstan. Appointed regent by Wigstan.	?
Beorhtwulf	840–852	Claimed to be a cousin of Wigstan. Usurped the kingship and forced Ælfflæd to marry his son, Beorhtfrith.	852
Burgred	852–874	Conjectured kinsman of Beorhtwulf. Fled to Rome in the face of a Danish invasion.	?
Ceolwulf II	874–879 or c. 883	Possibly a descendant of the C-dynasty, of which Ceolwulf I was a member, perhaps via intermarriage with W-dynasty. Lost eastern Mercia to the Danes in 877.	879 or c. 883
Æthelred II (Lord)	c. 883–911	Recognised Alfred of Wessex as his overlord. Regarded as an 'ealdorman' by West Saxon sources.	911
Æthelflæd (Lady)	911–918	Wife of Æthelred II and daughter of Alfred of Wessex. Possibly descended from earlier Mercian kings via her mother. With her brother, Edward the Elder, reconquered eastern Mercia.	12 Jun 918
Ælfwynn (Lady)	918	Daughter of Æthelred II and Æthelflæd. Deposed by her uncle, Edward the Elder, Dec 918, who annexed Mercia to Wessex.	?

=== Titular kings following Mercia's annexation ===
Ruler	Reign	Biographical notes	Died
Æthelstan	924	Son of Edward the Elder and nephew of Æthelflæd. Became King of Mercia on Edward's death (Jul 924), and King of Wessex about 16 days later.	27 Oct 939
Eadgar	957–959	Nephew of Æthelstan. Seized control of Mercia and Northumbria in May 957, before succeeding to the reunited English throne in Oct 959.	8 Jul 975

== Ealdormen and Earls of the Mercians ==
The chief magnate of Mercia as an English province held the title of ealdorman until 1023/32, and earl thereafter. Both offices were royal appointments, but the latter in effect became hereditary.

Ealdormen of the Mercians (non-dynastic)
Earls of the Mercians (descendants of Leofwine)

Ruler	Reign	Biographical notes	Died
Ælfhere	957–983	Appointed ealdorman of Mercia in 957 by Eadgar, when the English kingdom was disunited.	983
Ælfric Cild	983–985	Brother-in-law of Ælfhere. Deposed by Æthelred the Unready in 985.	?
Wulfric Spot	?–1004	Possibly ealdorman of Mercia after the deposition of Ælfric Cild.	22 Oct 1004
Eadric Streona	1007–1017	Appointed by Æthelred. A notorious turncoat, he was later murdered by Cnut for his treachery.	25 Dec 1017
Leofwine	1017–1023/32	Possibly appointed by Cnut as ealdorman of Mercia, he was also ealdorman of the Hwicce.	1023/32
Leofric	1023/32–1057	Son of Leofwine, appointed by Cnut as earl. Chiefly remembered for his famous wife, Godgifu (Lady Godiva).	31 Aug or 30 Sep 1057
Ælfgar	1057–1062	Son of Leofric. Had previously been Earl of East Anglia until succeeding his father to Mercia.	1062
Eadwine	1062–1071	Son of Ælfgar. Submitted to William the Conqueror in 1066, but later rebelled, and was betrayed by his own men. Mercia was then broken up into smaller earldoms.	1071

=== Earls of March ===
The title Earl of March (etymologically identical to 'Earl of Mercia') was created in the western Midlands for Roger Mortimer in 1328. It has fallen extinct, and been recreated, three times since then, and exists today as a subsidiary title of the Duke of Richmond and Lennox.

== Kings of Mercia family tree ==
Kings of Mercia family tree

Icel; King of Mercia r.~527 (~515)–?
Cnebba; King of Mercia
Cynewald; King of Mercia
Creoda; King of Mercia ?-~593 r.~584–~593	Cearl; King of Mercia ?-~626 r.~606-626	Ælle; King of Deira d. 588 r.569–588
Pybba; King of Mercia ?-~606 r.~593–~606	Cwenburh	Edwin; King of Northumbria; ~586–632/33 r.616–632/33	Acha of Deira	Æthelfrith; King of Bernicia ?-616 r.592–616
Cenwalh; King of Wessex r.642–645 648–674	daughter	Eowa; King of Mercia ?-642 r.626–642	Penda; King of Mercia ?-c.655 r.626–655	? Cynewise	Oswiu; King of Northumbria and Mercia; ~612-670 r.655–658 (sole king, 656)	Cenred of Wessex
?
Cundwalh	Osmod	Alweo	Alchflaed; ~635-~714	Peada; King of Mercia (southern) ?-656 r.655–656	Æthelred I King of Mercia ?-704 r.675–704	Osthryth ?-697	Ealdfriht; King of Northumbria ?-704 r.685–704	Cuthburh ?-718	Ingild; 660-718
?
Centwine	Eanwulf	Æthelbald; King of Mercia ?-757 r.716–757	Wulfhere; King of Mercia ?-675 r.658-675	Alhfrith; King of Deira; ~630–~664 r.~626–655	Kyneburga ?-~680	Ceolred; King of Mercia ?-716 r.709-716	Ceolwald; King of Mercia r.~716	Eoppa
Cynreow	Thingfrith	Coenred; King of Mercia fl.675–709 r.704-709	Eaffa
Bassa	Offa; King of Mercia ?-796 r.757–796	Cynethryth ?-aft.798	Beornred; King of Mercia r.757	Ealhmund; King of Kent c.750–784 r.784
Cuthberht	Ecgfrith; King of Mercia r.796	Eadburh fl.787-802	Beorhtric; King of Wessex ?–802 r.786-802	Ælfflæd of Mercia	Æthelred I King of Northumbria; ~762–796 r.774-779 790-796	Ecgberht of Wessex; King of Mercia; 771/775-839 r.829-830
Coenwulf; King of Mercia ?-821 r.796–821	Ælfthryth of Mercia	Beorhtwulf; King of Mercia ?-852 r.839/40-852	Ceolwulf I King of Mercia r.821-823	Wiglaf; King of Mercia ?-839 r.827–829 830–839	Æthelred; Mucel	Eadburh	Æthelwulf; King of Wessex; 795–858 r.839-858
Cynehelm; King of Mercia ?-812 r.798–812	Cwenthryth	Beorhtfrith	Ælfflæd of Mercia ?-850 fl.840	Wigmund; King of Mercia r.~840	Ealhswith; 852–905	Alfred the Great; King of the Anglo-Saxons; 849–899 r.871-899	Burgred; King of Mercia ?–874 r.852-874	Æthelswith; 833–889
Beornwulf; King of Mercia ?-826 r.823-826	Ludeca; King of Mercia ?-827 r.826-827	?	Wigstan ?-d.840	Æthelred; Lord of the Mercians ?-911 r.~881–911	Æthelflæd; Lady of the Mercians; ~870–918 r. 911-918	Edward the Elder; King of the Anglo-Saxons; 871–924 r.899-924
Ealhhelm; Ealdorman fl. 940–951	Ceolwulf II; King of Mercia ?-~879 r.874–~879	Ælfwynn; Lady of the Mercians r.918	Æthelstan; King of Mercia; ~894–939 r.924	Edmund I King of the English ?-939 r.946
Ælfhere; Ealdorman of Mercia ?-983; 957–983	daughter	Ælfric; Cild; Ealdorman of Mercia fl.975-985 r.983-985	Leofwine; Ealdorman ?-1023/32 r.1017– 1023/32	Edgar I the Peaceful; ~943-975 r.957–959
Leofric; Earl of Mercia ?-1057 r.1023/32 –1057	Godiva ?- betw.1066 /1086
Wulfric; Spot; Ealdorman ?-1004 ?-1004	Eadric; Streona; Ealdorman ?-1017; 1007–1017	Ælfgar; Earl of Mercia ?-~1060 r.1057–1062
Burgheard ?–d. 1061	Edwin; Earl of Mercia ?-1071 r.1062–1071	Morcar; Earl of Northumbria ?-aft.1087 r.1065–1066	Harold; Godwinson; King of the English; ~1022–1066 r.1066	Ealdgyth fl.~1057– 1066	Gruffydd ap Llywelyn; King of Wales ?-1063 r.1055–1063
