= St Wystan's Church, Repton =

Church in Derbyshire, England

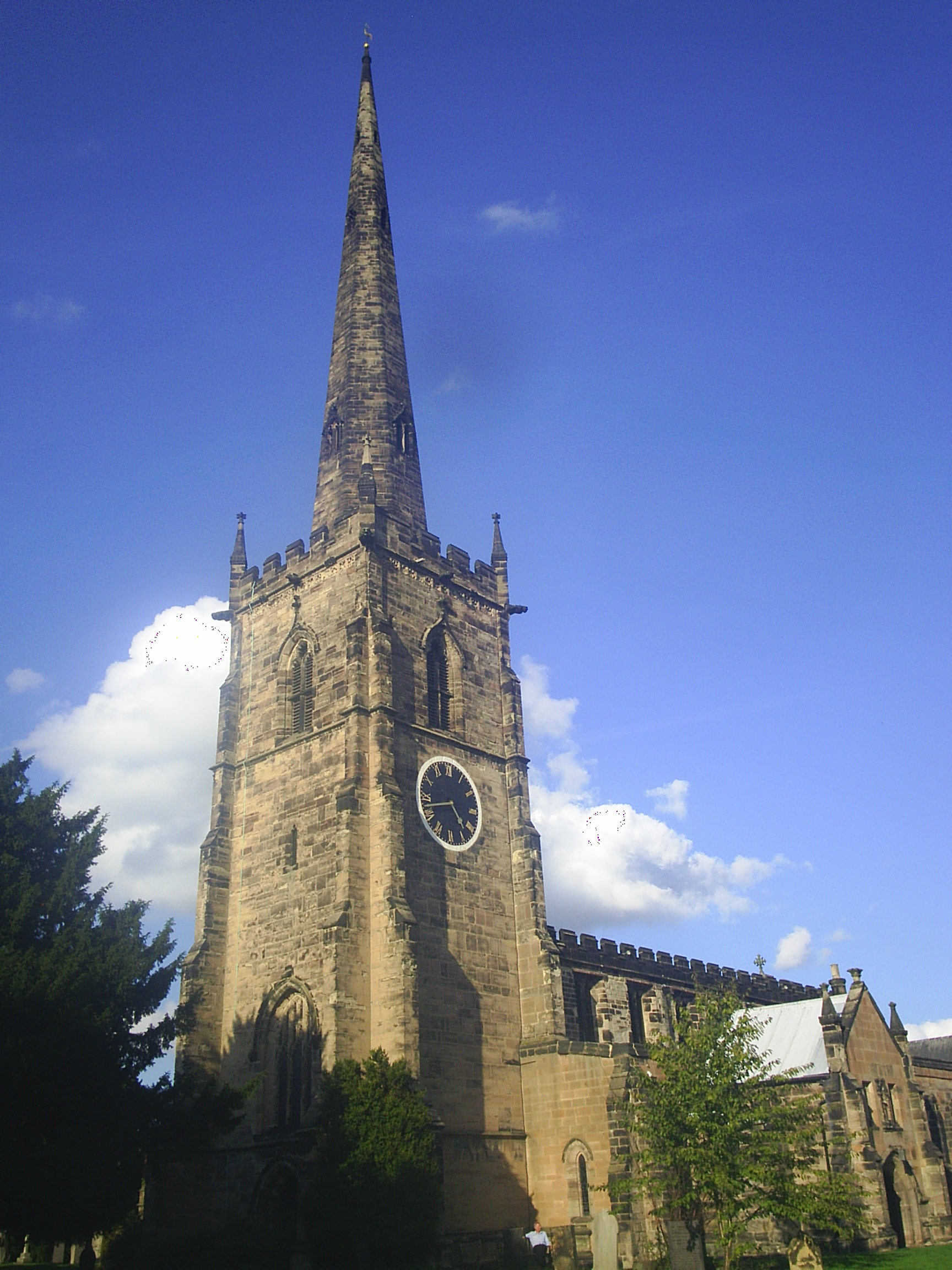
- Repton Church

- Location within Derbyshire
- 52°50′26″N 01°33′11″W
- OS grid reference: SK 30299 27168
- Country: England
- Denomination: Church of England
- Churchmanship: Broad Church
- Website: reptonchurch.uk

History
- Status: Parish church
- Founded: Repton Abbey established c. 600AD
- Founder: Saint David (traditionally)
- Dedication: St Wystan

Architecture
- Functional status: Active
- Heritage designation: Grade I listed
- Designated: 19 January 1967
- Architect: Arthur Blomfield (restoration)
- Architectural type: Church
- Style: Anglo-Saxon, Gothic

Clergy
- Vicar: Revd Martin Flowerdew

St Wystan's Church is a Church of England parish church in Repton, Derbyshire, that is famous for its Anglo-Saxon crypt which is the burial place of two Mercian kings. The church is recorded in the National Heritage List for England as a Grade I listed building, and is dedicated to the Anglo-Saxon Saint Wystan (or Wigstan), who was formerly buried within the church's crypt.

== Description ==
The Anglo-Saxon abbey church was cruciform and may have had a tower over its central crossing. The nave of the current church has Medieval Gothic north and south aisles that were rebuilt in the 13th century and widened early in the 14th century. The west tower and recessed spire were added in 1340. The top of the spire is 212 feet (65 m) above ground level. In the 15th century the nave clerestory with its timber roof and the two-storey porch were built and the tower windows were altered. Monuments inside the church include an alabaster effigy of a knight from about 1400 and monuments to members of the Thacker family from 1563 and 1710. The tower has a ring of eight bells, the oldest of which was cast at Leicester in about 1500.

The church was restored between 1885 and 1886 by Arthur Blomfield.

== Baptistry/crypt and royal burials ==
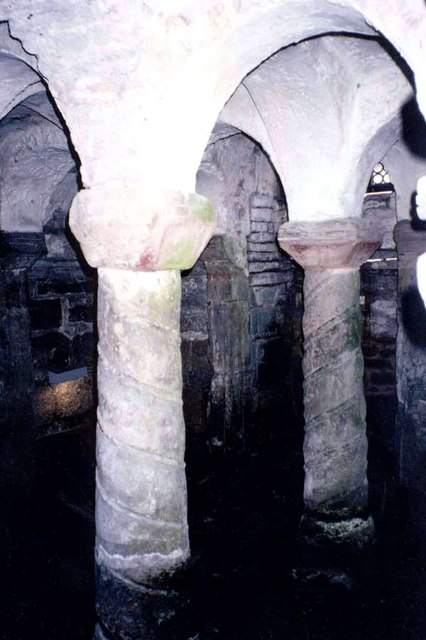
The crypt, formerly part of Repton Abbey

The crypt was constructed in the early 8th century; it was built over a spring and is thought to have originally been a baptistery.

The space was converted into a mausoleum for King Æthelbald of Mercia during his lifetime. King Wiglaf and his grandson Saint Wigstan (after whom the later church is named) were also buried in the crypt. It is thought that the royal bodies were first buried in the ground to decompose before their bones were interred in the crypt.

Following Saint Wigstan's burial, the crypt became a place of pilgrimage. However, following the Danish (Viking) invasion, St Wigstan's body was removed and taken with the fleeing monks. It was later returned but King Cnut had St Wigstan's remains removed again in the 10th century, having them reburied at Evesham Abbey in Worcestershire.

Pevsner described the Anglo-Saxon parts of St Wystan's parish church as "one of the most precious survivals of Anglo-Saxon architecture in England". In addition to the crypt they include the chancel, the northeast and southeast parts of the crossing and part of the north transept. The crypt is a square chamber with a roof of three rows of three domical vaults supported by two pilasters on each wall and four free-standing pillars at the four corners of the central vault.

It has been suggested that the crypt/ baptistry at Repton later influenced the design of both the spiral-columned shrine of Edward the Confessor and the Cosmati Coronation Pavement in Westminster Abbey, both commissioned by Henry III, based on close correspondence of their dimensions and design. These references are further understood to have been repeated at Soulton Hall in Shropshire, the house of the publisher of the Geneva Bible.

=== Royal burials ===
- King Æthelbald of Mercia – died 757
- King Wiglaf of Mercia – died 839
- Prince/Saint Wigstan – died 849 (remains moved by King Cnut to Evesham Abbey)

=== Archaeological sites ===
In the 1980s, a mass grave thought to be associated with the Great Danish Army was found in a mound, constructed over the remains of a Saxon chapel, to the west of St Wystan's Church by archaeologists Martin Biddle and Birthe Kjølbye-Biddle and their team. It contained roughly 300 sets of human remains, about 20% of them women. The remaining 80% were from men aged 18 to 45. Many of them showed signs of violent injury, and a variety of Viking artefacts, such as a Thor pendant, were found among the bones. Although initial radiocarbon dating suggested that the bodies had accumulated there over several centuries, in February 2018, a team from the University of Bristol announced that the remains could indeed all be dated to the late 800s AD, consistent with the time the army wintered in Derbyshire. They attributed the initial discrepancies to the marine reservoir effect from the high consumption of seafood by the Vikings.

Outside the crypt, the Repton Stone was found in 1979. This is interpreted as an upper section of a standing cross with, on one face, a carving of a mounted figure. The figure is of a man wearing mail armour and brandishing a sword and shield, with a diadem around his head. The mounted figure has been identified as King Æthelbald of Mercia. In 757, Æthelbald was killed at Seckington, Warwickshire, near the royal seat of Tamworth, and he was buried at Repton. If this is Æthelbald, it would make it the earliest large-scale pictorial representation of an English monarch. The Repton Stone is displayed in Derby Museum and Art Gallery.

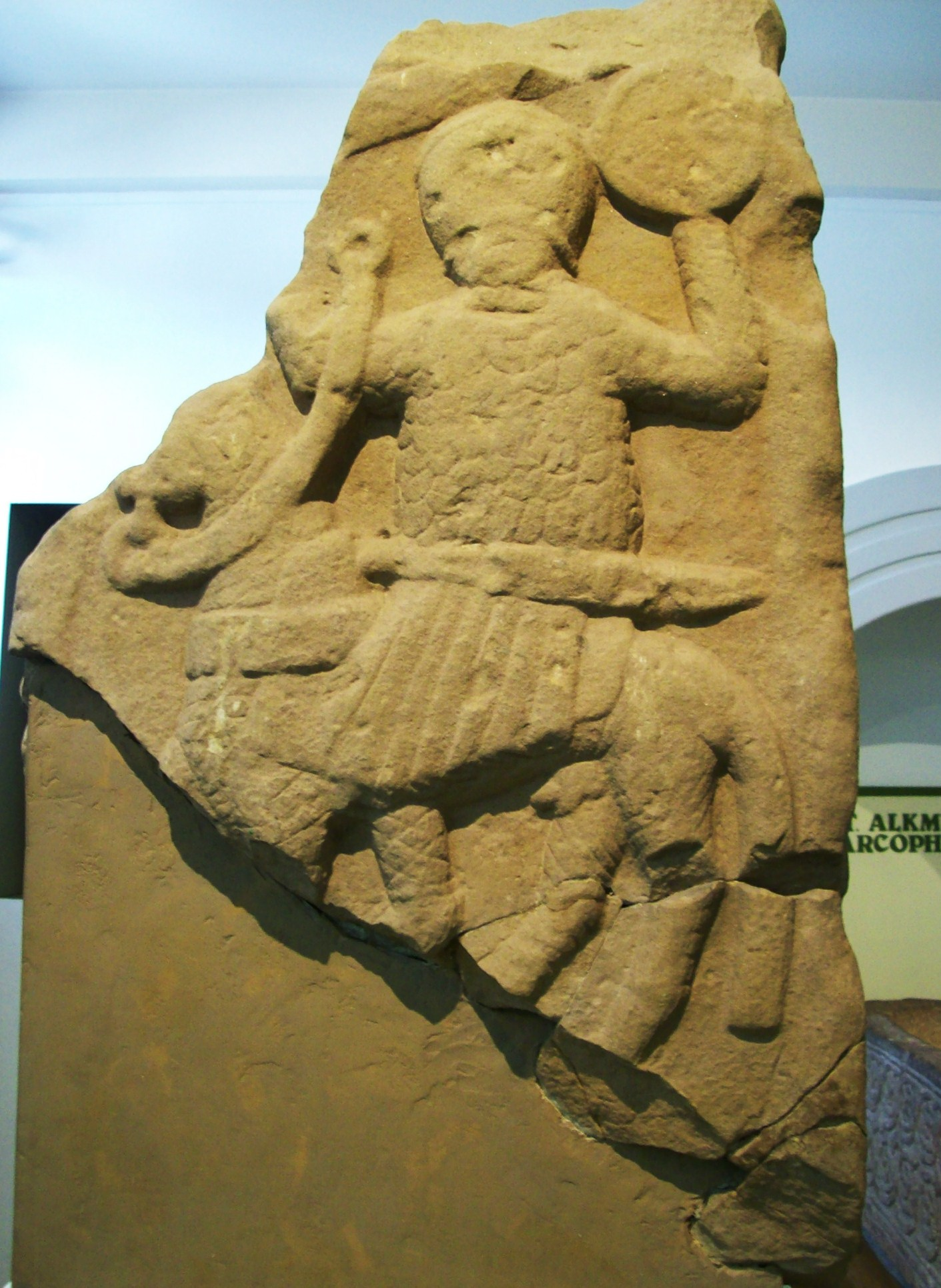
The mounted figure on the Repton Stone (now in Derby Museum) has been identified as King Æthelbald of Mercia

== Monuments ==
- South transept: George Waklin 1617 and Ellen Waklin 1614, John Macauley 1840, Thomas Whitehead 1645 (erected in 1802)
- South aisle: Gilbert Thacker 1563
- North aisle: Rev Joseph James 1856, William Bagshaw Stevens 1800, Francis Thacker 1710

== Churchyard ==
The churchyard contains the war graves of 17 Commonwealth service personnel, mostly Royal Air Force of World War II. Also buried there are the ashes of C. B. Fry, whose tombstone, dedicated in 2008, describes him as "Cricketer, Scholar, Athlete, Author – The Ultimate All-rounder".

== Organ ==
The church contains a two-manual 23-stop tracker action pipe organ by Peter Collins dating from 1998. The specification can be found at the National Pipe Organ Register.

=== Organists ===
- Thomas Dalby c. 1847 – 1848 (afterwards organist of New Romney, then St Mary Magdalene's Church, Launceston)
- Herbert Stevens 1865–????
- A. E. Rogers 1887–????
- Mr. Hodgkinson c. 1903
- William James c. 1909
- Edgar Foster ????–1916
- Miss Partridge 1916–1918
- Edgar Foster 1918–????
- Cyril Woodward c. 1950s
- Andrew Patterson 1983–1987
- Terence W. Bennett 1987

== Parish status ==
The church is in a joint parish with:

- St Mary the Virgin's Church, Newton Solney
- St Saviour's Church, Foremark

== See also ==
- Grade I listed churches in Derbyshire
- Grade I listed buildings in Derbyshire
- Listed buildings in Repton
- Repton Abbey
