= Repton Abbey =

Former abbey in Derbyshire, United Kingdom

- Location within Derbyshire
- Interactive map of Repton Abbey

Monastery information
- Order: Benedictine
- Established: c. 600
- Disestablished: Abandoned 873

People
- Important associated figures: Saint Alfthritha, former Abbess; Saint Edburga of Repton, former Abbess; Saint Guthlac, visited to receive the tonsure; Saint Werburgh, first recorded Abbess; Saint Wigstan, formerly buried within the abbey's crypt; King Æthelbald of Mercia, buried within the abbey's crypt; King Wiglaf of Mercia, buried within the abbey's crypt

Site
- Location: Repton, Derbyshire, England
- Coordinates: 52°50′29″N 1°33′04″W

Repton Abbey was an Anglo-Saxon Benedictine abbey in Derbyshire, England. Founded in the 7th century, the abbey was a double monastery, a community of both monks and nuns. The abbey is noted for its connections to various saints and Mercian royalty; two of the thirty-seven Mercian Kings were buried within the abbey's crypt. The abbey was abandoned in 873, when Repton was overrun by the invading Great Heathen Army.

== History ==
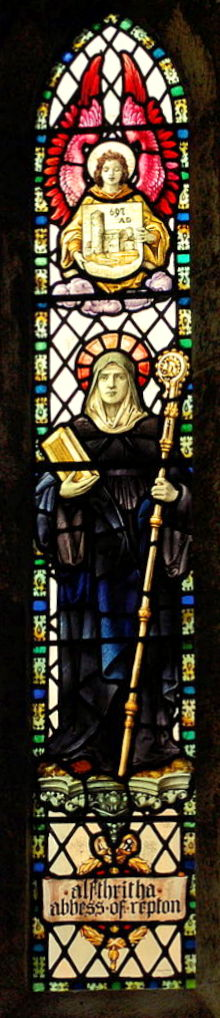
Stained glass window depicting St Alfthritha, former Abbess of Repton

The abbey is traditionally recorded as being founded in about 600 AD by Saint David. However, another source states that the abbey may have been founded around 60 years later by the Mercian royal family.

The abbey was a double monastery, housing both monks and nuns and headed by an abbess. The first abbess is recorded as being Saint Werburgh or Werberga (d. 699), daughter of Wulfhere, King of Mercia and Saint Ermelida (who was daughter of Eorcenberht, King of Kent). The monks and nuns of the abbey were almost exclusively nobles and aristocrats, with many of the abbesses, such as Werburgh, related to royalty.

In 697 the abbey, when under the control of Abbess Alfthritha, was visited by Guthlac, who wished to receive "the tonsure and religious dress, determined to do penance for his sins". Guthlac left the abbey to live a solitary life as a hermit.

The abbey's crypt was constructed in the first half of the 8th century (before 740), and is thought to have originally been a baptistery, as it is built on top of a natural spring. It was later converted for use as a mausoleum, with the first interment being that of King Æthelbald of Mercia, who was murdered at Seckington in Warwickshire in 757.

The east-end of the abbey church (the chancel), and the crypt, were renovated by King Wiglaf of Mercia. King Wiglaf was buried within the crypt following his death in 839.

Wiglaf was succeeded to the Mercian throne by his grandson, Wigstan. King Wigstan was murdered in 840, and his remains were also placed within the crypt in 849. After reports of miracles at his tomb the abbey became a place of pilgrimage, and from the 9th century Wigstan was considered a saint. This upsurge in visitors led to the need for additional staircases to be constructed to manage the flow of visitors into and out of the crypt.

Around the 9th century porticoes were added to the north and south of the abbey church. The church itself is known to have been decorated with multi-coloured stained glass, stone sculptures and stucco wall mouldings.

=== Destruction ===
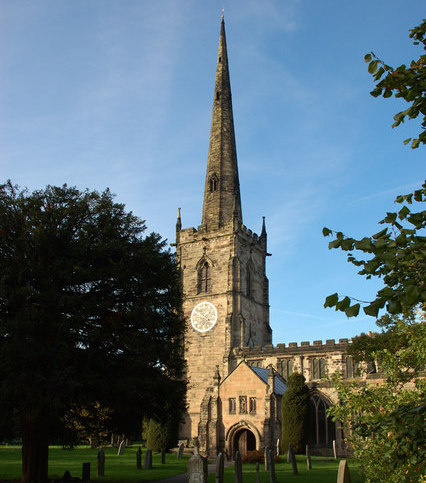
St Wystan's Church, Repton

In the autumn of 873 the Great Heathen Army reached Repton, establishing winter quarters there, before completing their conquest of Mercia in 874. The monks and nuns were left with no choice but to flee, taking the remains of Saint Wigstan with them.

The Army looted and destroyed the abbey, and built a fortified encampment in the grounds, between the abbey church and the River Trent. The River Trent at this point ran adjacent to the abbey grounds; it now flows around a quarter of a mile north of the village. In the area occupied by the current vicarage's lawn, was a Viking burial mound, within which the remains of 200 Viking men, and 49 Anglo-Saxon women, have been found. Other Viking mounds and cenotaphs are at the nearby Heath Wood barrow cemetery.

When the Vikings departed in 874, they had destroyed the abbey buildings (many of which were made of wood), and set fire to the abbey church.

=== Parish Church ===
For later history see: St Wystan's Church, Repton

The abbey church was partially restored approximately 40 to 50 years later, serving as a parish church rather than an abbey. Little of the Saxon abbey church could be saved, and much of the upper walls and the entire roof had to be completely rebuilt.

In the 12th century the advowson of this church was given to the newly formed Repton Priory, which was established a short distance away. It was rebuilt and enlarged between the 13th and 15th centuries, with the 212 feet (65 m) high tower and spire added in the 15th century.

== Crypt and notable burials ==
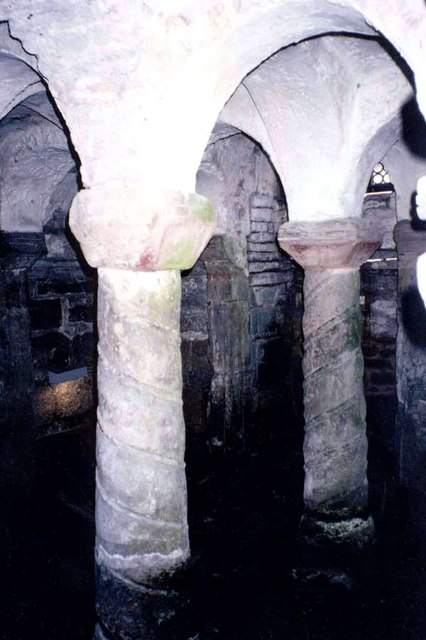
The crypt of the former abbey

The abbey's crypt was constructed over a spring in the early 8th century, and is thought to have originally been a baptistery. Later in the 8th century it was converted into a mausoleum for King Æthelbald of Mercia (reign: 716–757). King Wiglaf (died c. 840) and his grandson Saint Wigstan (killed 840) were later also buried in the crypt. It is thought that these royal bodies were first buried in the ground to decompose, before their bones were interred within the crypt.

Following reports of miracles associated with Saint Wigstan, the crypt became a place of pilgrimage. However, following the Viking invasion, Wigstan's bones were removed and taken with the fleeing monks and nuns. They were later returned, but King Cnut had Wigstan's remains removed again in the 10th century to be reburied at Evesham Abbey.

The crypt was incorporated into the later St Wystan's Church, which was constructed on the site of the abbey. Nikolaus Pevsner described the Anglo-Saxon parts of this church as "one of the most precious survivals of Anglo-Saxon architecture in England". In addition to the crypt they include the chancel, the northeast and southeast parts of the crossing and part of the north transept. The crypt is a square chamber with a roof of three rows of three domical vaults supported by two pilasters on each wall and four free-standing pillars at the four corners of the central vault.

It has been suggested that the crypt at Repton later influenced the design of both the spiral-columned shrine of Edward the Confessor and the Cosmati Coronation Pavement in Westminster Abbey, both commissioned by Henry III, based on close correspondence of their dimensions and design.

=== Royal burials ===
- Merewalh, sub-king of the Magonsæte (died between 670 and 685)
- King Æthelbald of Mercia – murdered 757.
- King Wiglaf of Mercia – died 839.
- Prince/Saint Wigstan – murdered 849. (remains moved by King Cnut to Evesham Abbey)

=== Viking burial site ===
In the 1980s, a mass grave thought to be associated with the Great Danish Army was found in St Wystan's Church in Repton by archaeologists Martin Biddle and Birthe Kjølbye-Biddle and their team. It contained roughly 300 sets of human remains, about one fifth of them women. The remaining 80% were from men aged 18 to 45. Many of them showed signs of violent injury, and a variety of Viking artefacts, such as a Thor pendant, were found among the bones. Although initial radiocarbon dating suggested that the bodies had accumulated there over several centuries, in February 2018, a team out of the University of Bristol announced that the remains could indeed all be dated to the late 800s AD, consistent with the time the army wintered in Derbyshire. They attributed the initial discrepancies to the high consumption of seafood by the Vikings. Because the carbon in the Earth's oceans is older than much of the carbon found by organisms on land, radiocarbon dating must be adjusted. This is called the marine reservoir effect.

== Abbesses of Repton ==
- Saint Werburgh or Werberga (d. 699), daughter of Wulfhere, King of Mercia and Saint Ermelida (who was daughter of Eorcenberht, King of Kent) is locally recorded as the first known Abbess of Repton.
- Saint Edburga of Repton (d. c. 700), thought to have been the daughter of King Ealdwulf of East Anglia, became abbess under the patronage of Wulfhere, King of Mercia. Venerated as a saint, she inherited the position of Abbess of Repton after the death of Elfrida and she is mentioned in the Life of St Guthlac. She was translated, however, to Southwell where a Pilgrims guide to Shrines and burial places of the Saints of England supposedly written in 1000AD and records that “There resteth Saint Eadburh, in the minster of Southwell, near the water of the Trent.”
