= Sigeric II of Essex =

Sigeric II was the last known King of Essex. He is only recorded in a lease (S 1791) dated between 829 and 837. Sigeric is shown in the text as a minister of King Wiglaf of Mercia but attested as King of the East Saxons.
