= Ceolwulf II of Mercia =

King of Mercia (died c. 879)

Ceolwulf II
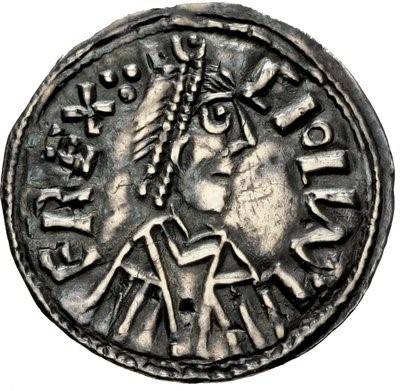
- Silver penny of Ceolwulf. Legend: ciolvvl f rex

King of Mercia
- Reign: 874–c. 879
- Predecessor: Burgred
- Successor: Æthelred (as Lord of the Mercians)
- Died: c. AD 879
- House: C-dynasty
- Religion: Chalcedonian Christianity

Ceolwulf II ([ˈt͡ʃe͜oːl.wuɫf], lit. 'ship-wolf'; d. c. AD 879) was the last king of independent Mercia. He succeeded Burgred of Mercia who was deposed by the Vikings in 874. His reign is generally dated 874 to 879 based on a Mercian regnal list which gives him a reign of five years. However, D. P. Kirby argues that he probably reigned into the early 880s. By 883, he was replaced by Æthelred, Lord of the Mercians, who became ruler of Mercia with the support of Alfred the Great, king of Wessex.

== Dynastic background ==
On anthroponymic grounds, Ceolwulf is thought to belong to the C dynasty of Mercian kings, a family which claimed descent from Pybba of Mercia. The C dynasty, beginning with Coenwulf, may have had ties to the ruling family of Hwicce in south-west Mercia.

Ceolwulf's immediate ancestry is unknown, but he is thought to be a descendant of Ceolwulf I through his daughter Ælfflæd. Ælfflæd was first married to Wigmund, son of King Wiglaf, and then to Beorhtfrith, son of King Beorhtwulf. Far from being "an unwise king's thane", it is clear that Ceolwulf was a descendant of previous kings. A number of thegns who witnessed charters under Burgred witnessed charters under Ceolwulf, and his charters were witnessed by Mercian bishops, testifying to his acceptance in Mercia.

== Mercia, Wessex and the Vikings ==
The Anglo-Saxon Chronicle offers the following account of Ceolwulf:

This year went the army [i.e., the Great Heathen Army] from the Kingdom of Lindsey to Repton, and there took up their winter-quarters, drove the king [of Mercia], Burgred, over sea, when he had reigned about two and twenty winters, and subdued all that land. He then went to Rome, and there remained to the end of his life. And his body lies in the church of Sancta Maria, in the school of the English nation. And the same year they gave Ceolwulf, an unwise king's thane, the Mercian kingdom to hold; and he swore oaths to them, and gave hostages, that it should be ready for them on whatever day they would have it; and he would be ready with himself, and with all those that would remain with him, at the service of the army.

The Chronicle was compiled on the orders of Alfred the Great, brother-in-law of King Burgred. This account is considered to be biased and politically motivated, written with a view of strengthening the claims of Alfred and Edward the Elder to the overlordship of Mercia, evidenced by a 2015 find near Leominster of Anglo-Saxon Imperial coins dated to around 879, presumed to have been buried by retreating Vikings. The coins depict both Ceolwulf as a king as well as Alfred, leading some experts to indicate that the two were equals. According to Gareth Williams of the British Museum, "these coins enable us to reinterpret our history at a key moment in the creation of England as a single kingdom."

Ceolwulf's kingdom is presumed to have been reduced to the northern and western parts of Mercia.

== Wales ==
In 878, King Rhodri Mawr of Gwynedd was killed in battle against the English. As Alfred was then occupied fighting the Vikings, and Mercia traditionally claimed hegemony over Wales, the English leader was probably Ceolwulf. In 881 Rhodri's sons defeated the Mercians at the Battle of the Conwy, a victory described in Welsh annals as "revenge of God for Rhodri". The Mercian leader was Edryd Long-Hair, almost certainly Ceolwulf's successor as Mercian ruler, Æthelred.

== Coinage and London ==
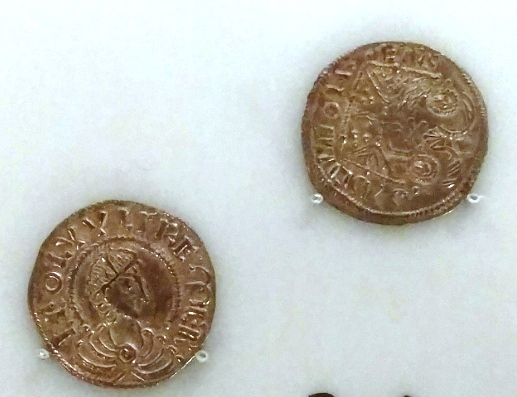
Coin of King Ceolwulf II of Mercia, Two-Emperor type, suggesting an alliance with Alfred the Great

Three types of silver penny have been found which were issued in Ceolwulf's name. The bulk of them were minted at London and of the type designated as "Cross-and-Lozenge", which was also in use by Alfred of Wessex. Ceolwulf's coinage appears to be closely related to that of Alfred of Wessex, and it has been suggested on this basis that the two kings co-operated against the Vikings.

Simon Keynes and the numismatist Mark Blackburn initially suggested that in about 875, Alfred was the sole recognised ruler in London, while Ceolwulf's involvement would have come about only towards the end of his reign, 879. However, in 1998, the same year that their discussion was published, another Cross-and-Lozenge penny struck in Ceolwulf's name came to light, which appears to be contemporary with Alfred's earliest coinage.

In 2015, a metal-detectorist uncovered a hoard of Viking Age coins, jewellery and silver ingots near Watlington, Oxfordshire. The find, dating to the late 870s, included thirteen examples of the rare ‘Two Emperors’ penny which depict Alfred and Ceolwulf seated side by side.

== See also ==
- Herefordshire hoard
- Kings of Mercia family tree

== Notes ==
Regnal titles
Preceded by Burgred	King of Mercia; 874 – c. 879	Succeeded by Aethelred as Lord of the Mercians
