= John Auden =

John Lorimer Auden MC (23 August 1894 – 30 March 1959), was an English solicitor, deputy coroner for Staffordshire and a territorial soldier who served in the First World War. He was a collector of natural history.

John Lorimer Auden was born in 1894 at Repton, Derbyshire. His father was Thomas Edward Auden (1864–1935), also a solicitor and deputy coroner for Staffordshire. The fortunes of the Auden family were established by William Auden (1726–1794) based on ownership of collieries and ironworks at Rowley Regis. They were also aided by the marriage of the Reverend Thomas Auden (1836–1920) to the daughter of William Hopkins, a Staffordshire landowner, who held the patronage of St Michael and All Angels' Church, Church Broughton and St John the Divine, Horninglow. A number of clergy followed but Auden's father, Thomas Edward, was of a different mould enjoying a "Huntin', Shootin' and Fishin' existence, blasting away at stags each year in Mull in the Hebrides". He was first cousin to the poet W. H. Auden.

Auden was educated at Marlborough College from 1908 to 1911 where his academic results were not encouraging. He passed his law examinations and joined the family firm of solicitors after his war service.

He was commissioned as a second lieutenant into the 6th (Territorial Force) Battalion, North Staffordshire Regiment in 1913 and fought in the First World War. By now a lieutenant, having been promoted to that rank in August 1914, he was awarded the Military Cross in 1916, the citation for which appeared in The London Gazette in August 1916 and reads as follows:

For conspicuous gallantry and coolness in action. Under heavy fire he reached the enemy's trench with a handful of men and lay under the parapet all day until dark. He then assisted several wounded men to get back and returned himself with a useful report.

Auden married Joan Constance Moxham, daughter of a Swansea architect, at All Souls, Langham Place in July 1922. The couple had one child, John Anthony Lorimer Auden, born in 1926. After they divorced he married Marie Charlotte Howard in 1932.

He was an assiduous observer and collector of natural history. The bulk of his collection of birds, including purchased "Hastings Rarities", was presented to Birmingham Museum and Art Gallery by Repton School in 1962 and his collection of land and freshwater molluscs is held by the Ludlow Museum Resource Centre.
