= Cuthberht of Mercia =

Cuthberht's descendant's

Cuthberht was a Mercian of the 8th century who may have been the same person as an ealdorman of that name who witnessed charters during the reign of Offa. Cuthberht may also be the same person as the Cuthberht mentioned in the Anglo-Saxon Chronicle in the entry for 779.

Cuthberht had at least three sons they were:

- Coenwulf, King of Mercia in 796–821.
- Cuthred, King of Kent in 798–807.
- Ceolwulf, King of Mercia in 821–823.
