= Æthelred Mucel =

Anglo-Saxon noble from Mercia

Æthelred Mucel was an Anglo-Saxon noble from Mercia who was the father of Ealhswith, the wife of Alfred the Great.

Æthelred witnessed several charters between 867 and 895; he may be the same man as an ealdorman called 'Mucel' who witnessed Mercian charters between 836 and 866. It is possible he was the son of another Mucel who witnessed Mercian charters from 814 to the 840s. He is described by Asser as an ealdorman of the Gaini, a tribe after whom Gainsborough in Lincolnshire is believed to be named.

In his biography of Alfred the Great, Asser says that in 868 Alfred "was betrothed to and married a wife from Mercia, of noble family, namely the daughter of Æthelred (who was known as Mucel), ealdorman of the Gaini. The woman's mother was called Eadburh, from the royal stock of the king of the Mercians. I often saw her myself with my very own eyes for several years before her death. She was a notable woman, who remained for many years after the death of her husband a chaste widow, until her death". The Gaini are otherwise unknown, but were probably one of the tribal divisions of the Mercians. According to the historian Richard Abels, Eadburh was a descendant of King Cenwulf of Mercia. The scholar, Ford Mommaerts-Browne, however, suggests that she was a grandchild of Ceolwulf, through his daughter, Ælfflæd, and her husband, Wigmund.

Æthelred had at least two children with Eadburh. They were:

- Ealdorman Æthelwulf (died 903)
- Ealhswith (died 5 December 902), who in 868 married Alfred the Great, by whom she had five children who survived to adulthood.
