= Wigmund of Mercia =

9th-century Mercian, perhaps king

Wigmund may have briefly reigned in Mercia about 840, in succession to his father, Wiglaf of Mercia. He may, on the other hand, have predeceased his father and never been anything more than a co-ruler with him. He was himself the father of Wigstan who later declined kingship. He married Ælfflæd, daughter of Ceolwulf I, which suggests that Ceolwulf II was a descendant of Wigmund and the last king of the original Mercian dynasty. According to Ford Mommaerts-Browne, he may also have been the father of Eadburh, wife of Æthelred Mucel, and mother of Eahlswith.

== See also ==
- Kings of Mercia family tree
