= 840 Erzurum earthquake =

Possible earthquake

Coordinates: 39.913°N 41.264°E

The 840 Erzurum earthquake reportedly took place in the city of Qaliqala (modern day Erzurum).

== History ==
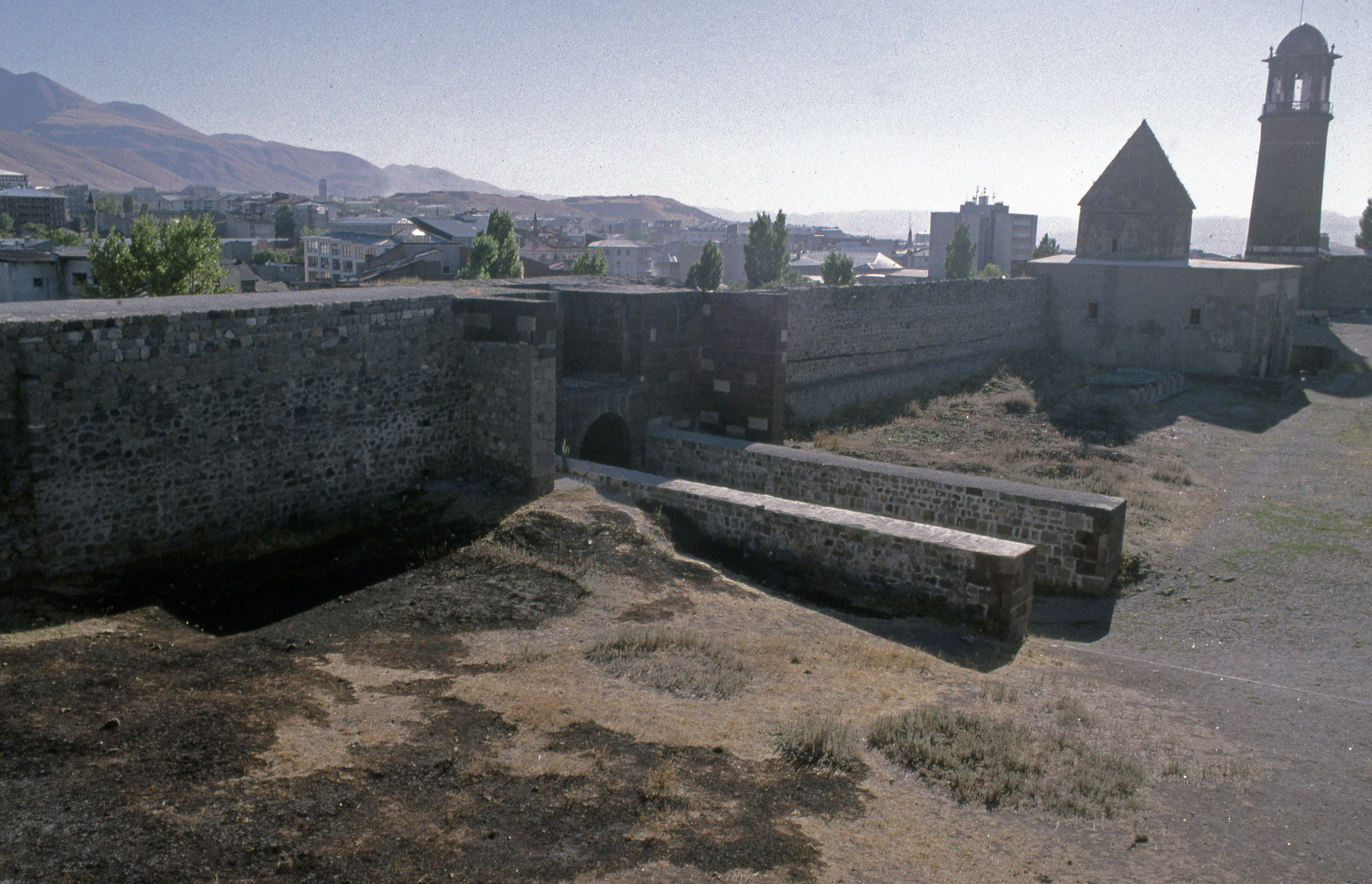
The defensive walls of Erzurum Citadel, modern day

The primary source for this earthquake is the chronicle of Michael the Syrian (12th century). The narrative reports that it took place on a Friday of the month June (Haziran in the original text). Michael dates the event to year 1151 of the Seleucid era (Anno Graecorum), which corresponds to the year 840 Anno Domini.

According to Michael's narrative, eight towers of Erzurum's defensive wall collapsed due to the earthquake. He also reports the collapse of many houses. He estimates that about 200 people were killed by the earthquake. Tremors continued for two months following the initial earthquakes, forcing the surviving locals to move to the city's fields. They lived in fear of a second earthquake.

The Armenian epitome of Michael the Syrian's chronicle omits the earthquake. The original chronicle features an unreliable chronology, so there are doubts concerning the date and location of this earthquake.

The city of Erzurum has been reconstructed several times. No archaeological and architectural data have been connected to this earthquake.

== Sources ==
- Guidoboni, Emanuela; Traina, Giusto (1995), A new catalogue of earthquakes in the historical Armenian area from antiquity to the 12th century, Annals of Geophysics
