= Ceolwulf I of Mercia =

King of Mercia from 821 to 823

Ceolwulf I
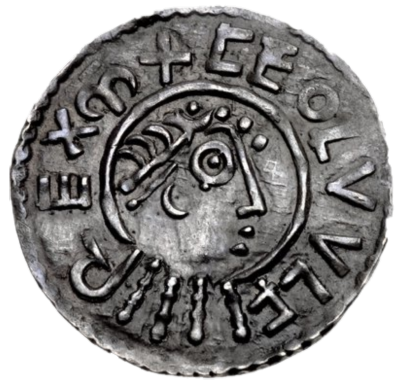
- Silver penny of Ceolwulf from a mint in East Anglia, struck 821–823; Legend: + ceolvvlf rex m

King of Mercia
- Reign: 821–823
- Predecessor: Coenwulf
- Successor: Beornwulf
- Spouse: Unknown
- Issue: Ælfflæd of Mercia
- House: C-dynasty
- Father: Cuthberht of Mercia
- Mother: Unknown

Ceolwulf I was the King of Mercia, a kingdom of Anglo-Saxon England, from 821 until his deposition in 823. He was the brother of Coenwulf, his predecessor, and was deposed by Beornwulf.

William of Malmesbury declared that, after Cœnwulf: "the kingdom of the Mercians declining, and if I may use the expression, nearly lifeless, produced nothing worthy of historical commemoration." Actually, Mercia did have a moment of glory that William was unaware of. Indicating the year 822, the Annales Cambriae states: "The fortress of Degannwy (in Gwynedd) is destroyed by the Saxons and they took the kingdom of Powys into their own control."

A later charter depicts a disturbed state of affairs during Ceolwulf's reign: "After the death of Cœnwulf, king of the Mercians, many disagreements and innumerable disputes arose among leading persons of every kind—kings, bishops, and ministers of the churches of God—concerning all manner of secular affairs". In 823, sometime after 26 May, on which date he granted land to Archbishop Wulfred in exchange for a gold and silver vessel, Ceolwulf was overthrown. His replacement was Beornwulf, whose pedigree is not known.

Ceolwulf ruled Kent directly—in his two charters, he is styled as "King of the Mercians and of the men of Kent".

== Family ==
Family tree of Ceolwulf

Ceolwulf was the son of Cuthberht of Mercia and the brother of Coenwulf of Mercia (d. 821) and Cuthred of Kent (d. 807). Coenwulf ruled as king of Mercia from 796 until his death in 821. In 798 Coenwulf installed his brother Cuthred as king of Kent in 798. Cuthred ruled there until his death in 807, after which Kent reverted to Mercia. Upon Coenwulf's death in 821 he was succeeded by Ceolwulf.

The name of Ceolwulf's wife is not recorded; however, they had one known child, a daughter: Ælfflæd of Mercia.

According to a tradition preserved at Evesham, Ceolwulf's daughter Ælfflæd married Wigmund, the son of Wiglaf, King of Mercia (827–839). Wiglaf was succeeded by Beorhtwulf and his son Berhtfrith sought to marry King Wigmund's widow so that he could become king. This was opposed by Wigstan, the son of Wigmund and Ælfflæd, and Berhtfrith slew Wigstan in 849. However, there is no record outside this Evesham tradition that Wigmund was ever king. Alfred Smyth suggests that Ceolwulf II, who became king following the Viking expulsion of King Burgred in 874, may have been another son of Ælfflæd, and thus a grandson of Ceolwulf I.

== See also ==
- List of monarchs of Mercia

Ceolwulf I of Mercia C-dynasty of the Mercians
Regnal titles
Preceded by Coenwulf	King of Mercia; 821–823	Succeeded by Beornwulf
Preceded by Coenwulf	Ruler of East Anglia; 821–823	Succeeded by Beornwulf
Preceded by Coenwulf	Ruler of Kent; 821–823	Succeeded by Beornwulf
