= Burgred of Mercia =

9th-century king of Mercia

Burgred
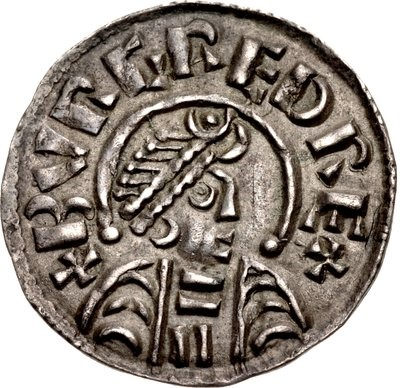
- Silver penny struck between 866 and 868/870 by Burgred; Legend:+ bvrgred rex

King of Mercia
- Reign: 852–874
- Predecessor: Beorhtwulf
- Successor: Ceolwulf II
- Died: 888; Rome
- Burial: Santo Spirito in Sassia
- Spouse: Æthelswith

Burgred (also Burhred or Burghred; Old English: Burhræd) was an Anglo-Saxon king of Mercia from 852 to 874.

== Family ==
Burgred became king of Mercia in 852, and may have been related to his predecessor Beorhtwulf. After Easter in 853, Burgred married Æthelswith, daughter of Æthelwulf, king of the West Saxons. The marriage was celebrated at the royal villa of Chippenham in Wessex.

== Life ==
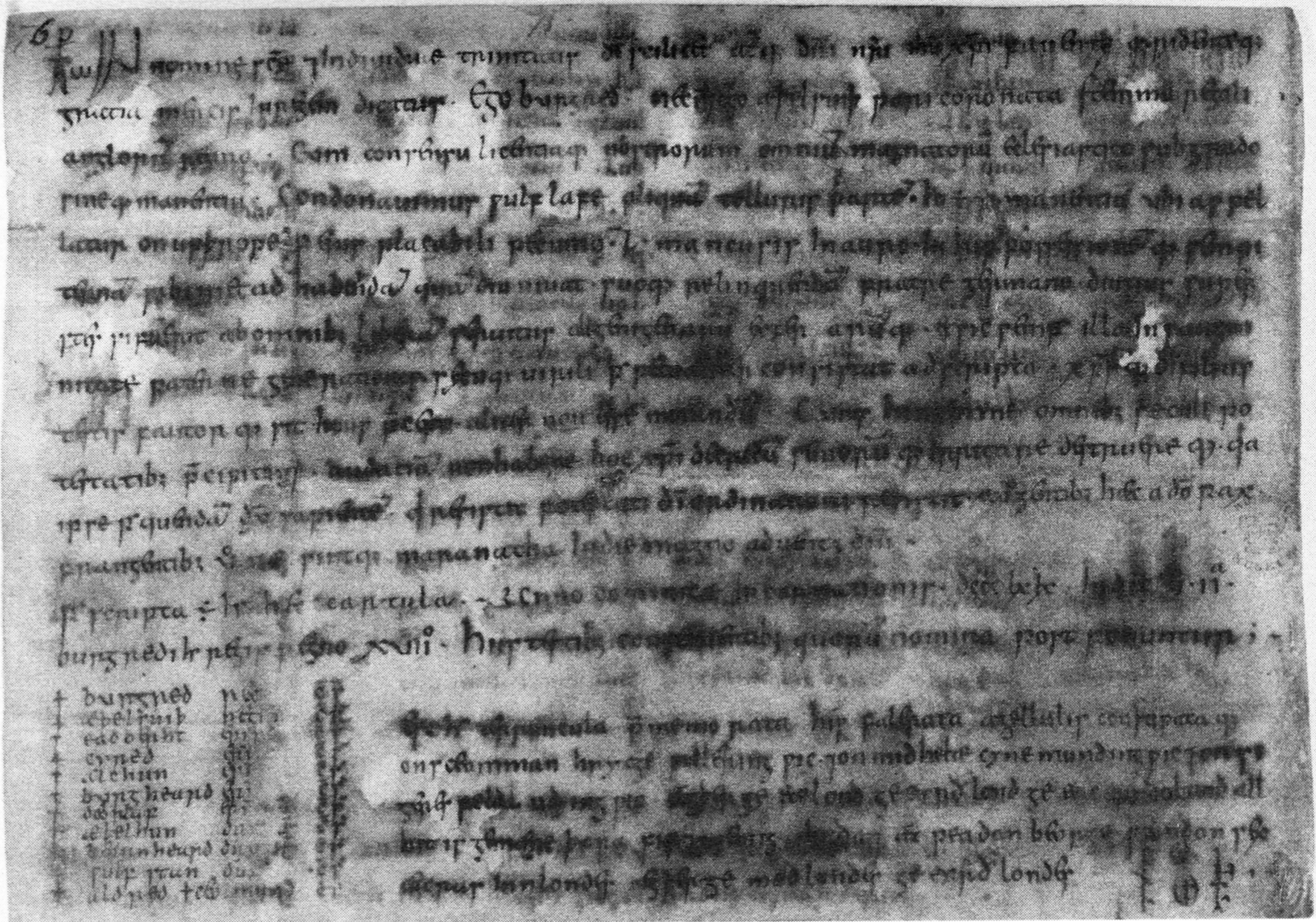
A charter of Burgred's dated 869

In 853 Burgred sent messengers to Æthelwulf, king of the West Saxons, seeking his help to subjugate the Welsh, who lived between Mercia and the western sea, as they were rebelling against his rule. Immediately King Æthelwulf advanced with Burgred against the Welsh, and successfully repressed the rebellion.

Twelve years after Burgred's success against the Welsh, in 865, the Great Heathen Army arrived. Following its successful campaigns against East Anglia and Northumbria it advanced through Mercia, arriving in Nottingham in 867. Burgred then appealed to his brothers-in-law King Æthelred of Wessex and Alfred for assistance against them. The armies of Wessex and Mercia did no serious fighting as Burgred paid the invaders off. In 874 the march of the Vikings from Lindsey to Repton drove Burgred from his kingdom.

After Burgred left, the Vikings appointed a Mercian Ceolwulf to replace him, demanding oaths of loyalty to them. Burgred retired to Rome and died there. He was buried, according to the Anglo-Saxon Chronicle, "in the church of Sancta Maria, in the school of the English nation" (now Santo Spirito in Sassia) in Rome.

Single coins from the reign of Burgred continue to be found but Burgred coins within hoards are less common. In 1998 a hoard with Burgred coins was found by the Birmingham University Field Archaeology Unit near Banbury Castle.

== See also ==
- Kings of Mercia family tree

== Sources ==
- Anglo-Saxon Chronicle: MS A v. 3, Janet Bately (ed.), Brewer, Rochester (NY) 1986, ISBN 0-85991-103-9.

Regnal titles
Preceded by Beorhtwulf	King of Mercia; 852–874	Succeeded by Ceolwulf II
