= Ælfflæd of Mercia (II) =

9th-century possible daughter of Ceolwulf I of Mercia

Ælfflæd or Æthelflæd (fl. 840) is not recorded before the twelfth century. William of Malmesbury describes Æthelflæd as the daughter of King Ceolwulf I of Mercia, wife of King Wiglaf's son Wigmund, and mother of Wigstan.

According to Thomas of Marlborough's hagiographical life of Wigstan, when his father King Wigmund died in 840, Wigstan refused to become king, preferring a life of religion. His relative Beorhtwulf then asked for permission to marry the widowed queen, Æfflæd, and when Wigstan refused, he had him murdered. John of Worcester has a different version of Wigstan's parentage and death, which he dates to 849. Wigstan was regarded as a saint, like many other Anglo-Saxon royals murdered for political reasons.

She was the heir of her father and his brother Coenwulf, and, by the middle of the century, she was probably abbess of Winchcombe, as she was disposing of its property. She died after 850, and may have been the mother of King Ceolwulf II and Eadburh, wife of Æthelred Mucel.
