= Ealhswith =

Consort of Alfred the Great from 871 to 899

- Died: 5 December 902
- Burial: New Minster, Winchester
- Spouse: Alfred the Great (m. 868, died 899)
- Issue: Æthelflæd, Lady of the Mercians; Edward the Elder; Æthelgifu, Abbess of Shaftesbury; Ælfthryth, Countess of Flanders; Æthelweard
- Father: Æthelred Mucel
- Mother: Eadburh

Ealhswith or Ealswitha (died 5 December 902) was the wife of King Alfred the Great. She was the mother of King Edward the Elder who succeeded King Alfred to the Anglo-Saxon throne. Her father was a Mercian nobleman, Æthelred Mucel, Ealdorman of the Gaini, which is thought to be an old Mercian tribal group. Her mother was Eadburh, a member of the Mercian royal family and her lineage was one of the primary reasons for Alfred taking Ealhswith as his wife. She founded the nunnery of Nunnaminster.

== Descent ==
A charter of 897 (S 1442) discusses the responsibilities of Ealhswith's brother Æthelwulf towards the monastery of Winchcombe, and Barbara Yorke argues that as this monastery was claimed as a possession by the family of Ceolwulf and Coenwulf, brothers who were both kings of Mercia, Ealhswith was probably a member of this family. Richard Abels goes further, stating that she was descended from King Coenwulf.

This descent from Mercian Kings was what drew Alfred to Ealhswith, making her an attractive candidate for marriage. During the time of King Alfred’s reign, he inherited Wessex through his late father, King Æthelwulf, and the genealogies of both Aethelwulf, and Alfred’s mother, Osburh, were used to justify his rule over England. His marriage with Ealhswith was seen as an alliance and a merging of other kingdoms within England. Ealhswith’s genealogy and descent from ancient Mercian Kings was used to grant Alfred the right to rule over all of England on the Wessex throne; an authority that he started at the beginning of his rule and was followed by his successors to the throne of Wessex.

== Life ==
Contemporary sources tell us very little about her life. The only primary sources that reveals her name is in King Alfred’s Will. Within this Will, she is the last beneficiary listed. Alfred grants her estates at Lambourn, Wantage, and Edington, along with one hundred pounds of gold. However, Alfred does not mention his three daughters by name or his youngest son, with Edward, his eldest son, being the only child named.

Asser was a Welsh monk who lived during the same time as Alfred, and he learned and taught at St. David’s in Wales. He was a scholar who would translate works of literature within St. David. The origins as to how Asser and Alfred met are unknown, but it is believed that they were at the same meeting after Alfred took control of the Welsh land. Asser would spend prolonged months with Alfred, translating works of literature for him and it was Alfred who approached Asser to write his biography, The Life of King Alfred. Within this biography, Asser writes about the genealogies of both Ealhswith and her mother, Eadburh. The Mercian kings Ealhswith hailed from were on Eadburh's side of the family. However, Asser only mentions Eadburh by name and does not call Ealhswith by her own name. Instead, he refers to her as “a noble Mercian Lady” and that she was a “chaste widow” after the death of Alfred. It is unknown why Asser omitted Ealhswith's name from the text, but chose to include her mother's.

In recent history, authors have cited Ealhswith by name more frequently and acknowledged her accomplishments. In Alex Traves, Genealogy and royal women in Asser’s Life of King Alfred: politics, prestige, and maternal kinship in early medieval England, he highlights her significance to Alfred and that she was an ideal bride for him in terms of the lineage tied to her. Her importance to Alfred was showcased by Traves, giving her credit for being one of the contributing factors to Alfred inheriting the throne. Traves and other modern authors give her recognition for her contributions to the English throne compared to Ealhswith's contemporaries.

She was married to Alfred in 868. His elder brother Æthelred was then king, and according to Asser, Alfred was regarded as heir apparent. The Danes occupied the Mercian town of Nottingham in that year and her marriage to King Alfred was seen as political leverage. Alfred inherited the throne after his brothers death in 871. In accordance with ninth century West Saxon custom, she was not granted the title of queen. According to King Alfred, this was due to a crime committed by a former queen of the West Saxons, Eadburh, who had attempted to poison an enemy and accidentally killed her husband King Beorhtric instead in 802. Ealhswith had two sons and three daughters who survived to adulthood.

She did not witness any surviving charters during Alfred's lifetime. After his death, in 901, Ealhswith did witness one charter during the reign of her son King Edward in which she is identified as "Ealhswið mater regis", Ealhswith mother of the king. Her name is subscribed immediately after King Edward, and before Edward's wife Ælfflæd.

Alfred left his wife three important symbolic estates in his will, Edington in Wiltshire, the site of one important victory over the Vikings, Lambourn in Berkshire, which was near another, and Wantage, his birthplace. These were all part of his bookland, and they stayed in royal possession after her death.

Ealhswith died on 5 December 902, and was buried in her son Edward's new Benedictine abbey, the New Minster, Winchester. Edward also had his father, Alfred, moved to New Minster, Winchester. She is commemorated in two early tenth century manuscripts as "the true and dear lady of the English".

== Patron ==
A common practice of royal women during the Anglo-Saxon Middle Ages was the founding of nunneries. These nunneries were often where royal or noble women retired upon the death of their husbands. Kings often sent their wives to nunneries to keep them away from political criticism that could follow their death, and to ensure that their wives did not do anything to tarnish their legacy. Ealhswith founded the convent of St Mary, usually called Nunnaminster, possibly after her husband's death.

== Children ==
Alfred and Ealhswith had five children who survived to adulthood.

- Æthelflæd (d. 918), Lady of the Mercians, married Æthelred, Lord of the Mercians
- Edward the Elder (d. 924), King of the Anglo-Saxons
- Æthelgifu, made abbess of her foundation at Shaftesbury by her father
- Ælfthryth, Countess of Flanders (d. 929), married Baldwin II, Count of Flanders
- Æthelweard (d. c. 920).

== See also ==
- House of Wessex family tree

== Sources ==
- Abels, Richard (1998). Alfred the Great: War, Kingship and Culture in Anglo-Saxon England. Harlow, Essex: Longman. ISBN 978-0-582-04047-2.* Anglo-Saxon Chronicles
- Costambeys, Marios (2004). "Ealhswith (d. 902), consort of Alfred, king of the West Saxons". Oxford Dictionary of National Biography. Oxford University Press. doi:10.1093/ref:odnb/39226. (subscription, Wikipedia Library access or UK public library membership required)
- Keynes, Simon; Lapidge, Michael, eds. (1983). Alfred the Great: Asser's Life of King Alfred & Other Contemporary Sources. London, UK: Penguin Classics. ISBN 978-0-14-044409-4.
- MacLean, Simon (February 2003). "Queenship, Nunneries and Royal Widowhood in Carolingian Europe." Past & Present 1, no.178: 3-38.
- Marafioti, Nicole (2014). The King's Body: Burial and Succession in Late Anglo-Saxon England. Toronto, Canada: University of Toronto Press. ISBN 978-1-4426-4758-9.
- Nelson, Janet (1999). Rulers and Ruling Families in Early Medieval Europe. Farnham, Surrey: Ashgate. ISBN 978-0-86078-802-7.
- Smyth, Alfred ed. and trans. (2002) The Medieval Life of King Alfred the Great: A Translation and Commentary on the Text Attributed to Asser. New York: Palgrave Macmillian, 2002.
- Thacker, Alan (2001). "Dynastic Monasteries and Family Cults". In Higham, N. J.; Hill, D. H. (eds.). Edward the Elder 899–924. Abingdon, Oxfordshire: Routledge. pp. 248–63. ISBN 978-0-415-21497-1.
- Traves, Alex (January 2022). "Genealogy and Royal Woman in Asser's Life of King Alfred: Politics, Prestige, and Maternal Kinship in early Medieval England." Early Medieval Europe 30, no.1: 101-124. https://doi.org/10.1111/emed.12521
- Yorke, Barbara (2001). "Edward as Ætheling". In Higham, N. J.; Hill, D. H. (eds.). Edward the Elder 899–924. Abingdon, Oxfordshire: Routledge. pp. 25–39. ISBN 978-0-415-21497-1.

Regnal titles
| Preceded by Wulfthryth? | Consort of the King of Wessex; 871–899 | Succeeded by Ecgwynn or Ælfflæd |
