= Marine reservoir effect =

Phenomenon affecting radiocarbon dating

The marine reservoir effect is a phenomenon affecting radiocarbon dating. Because much of the carbon consumed by organisms in the ocean is older than that consumed by organisms on land, samples from marine life and from organisms that consumed a lot of sea-based foods while alive may appear older when tested than they truly are. It is necessary to account for changes in the Earth's oceans to correct for the marine reservoir effect. The level of the effect on a particular sample varies significantly, depending on the body of water, and more locally on depths, upwelling currents, and freshwater discharges.

Typically, affected radiocarbon dates appear c. 400 ^{14}C years older than they would if unaffected. But the effect is highly variable in space and time, and can reach 800 to 1200 ^{14}C years in Arctic regions. In 2013, archaeologists at the Gottorp Castle Museum tested the effects of fish prepared in a newly made clay vessel on their ability to accurately measure carbon-14 in the clay pottery. After making the clay vessel fish was prepared in the vessel over a fire. The archaeologists made sure some of the fish stuck to the pot. The pot and some of the burnt crust at the bottom were tested which showed a carbon-14 ^{14}C age of 700 years old. Felix Riede estimated at the time the use of the carbon-14 method may be off by 2,000 years.

== Notable cases ==
Since its initial discovery in the 1980s, a Viking burial site in England confounded archaeologists. It contained coins and other physical materials associated with the late 800s CE, the time of the Great Danish Army, but the radiocarbon dating placed the roughly 300 bodies at a variety of different dates spanning centuries. In February 2018, a team out of the University of Bristol published a study attributing this to the large amounts of sea-based foods eaten by Vikings and placed the burial site in the late 800s.
