= Repton =

Village and civil parish in Derbyshire, England

Coordinates: 52.838°N 1.549°W

- Location within Derbyshire
- Population: 2,867 (2011 Census – Office for National Statistics)
- OS grid reference: SK3026
- District: South Derbyshire
- Shire county: Derbyshire
- Region: East Midlands
- Country: England
- Sovereign state: United Kingdom
- Post town: DERBY
- Postcode district: DE65
- Dialling code: 01283
- Police: Derbyshire
- Fire: Derbyshire
- Ambulance: East Midlands
- UK Parliament: South Derbyshire
- Website: Repton Village Website

Repton is a village and civil parish in the South Derbyshire district of Derbyshire, England. It lies on the edge of the River Trent floodplain, approximately 5 miles (8 km) north of Swadlincote and about 5 miles (8 km) northeast of Burton upon Trent, close to the county boundary with Staffordshire.

The population was recorded as 2,707 in the 2001 census and 2,867 in the 2011 census, with an estimated population of around 3,000 in 2021 based on Office for National Statistics small-area modelling.

Repton is notable for its Anglo-Saxon ecclesiastical heritage, including the site of Repton Abbey, the medieval Repton Priory, and the Anglo-Saxon St Wystan's Church. It is also the location of Repton School, one of England’s historic public schools.

== Geography ==
Repton is located in south Derbyshire on the northern edge of the River Trent floodplain, within gently undulating lowland countryside characteristic of the Trent valley. The village lies approximately 5 miles (8 km) north of Swadlincote and around 5 miles (8 km) northeast of Burton upon Trent, close to the boundary with Staffordshire.

The surrounding landscape is predominantly agricultural, with mixed arable and pasture land interspersed with hedgerows and small woodland areas. The lower-lying ground towards the River Trent is subject to periodic flooding, while the village itself occupies slightly elevated terrain.

== Transport ==
Repton is located near the A38 trunk road, which provides north–south road connections between Derby and Burton upon Trent, and onward links to the wider motorway network, including the M1 to the north-east and the M6 to the south-west.

Local road links connect Repton with neighbouring villages including Willington, Milton, and Foremark, with the River Trent historically forming a transport barrier in the area until the development of modern crossings and floodplain routes.

The nearest railway station is Willington railway station, approximately 2 miles (3 km) to the north-east, situated on the Derby–Birmingham line operated by East Midlands Railway. Services provide connections to Derby, Burton upon Trent, and Birmingham.

Bus services linking Repton with surrounding settlements operate via nearby main roads, with routes connecting to Derby, Burton upon Trent, and Swadlincote.

== Demography ==
The population of Repton has remained relatively stable since the 19th century, with gradual long-term growth influenced by its role as a local service centre and the presence of Repton School.

Historic census records indicate that the parish population was just over 1,100 in the early 19th century, rising to around 1,500 by mid-century and remaining broadly stable through the Victorian period.

By the mid-20th century, the population had increased to around 2,200, reflecting suburbanisation and improved transport connections in the Trent valley.

According to the United Kingdom Census, the population of the civil parish was 2,707 in 2001, increasing to 2,867 at the 2011 census.

At the time of the 2021 Census, Repton parish had an estimated population of approximately 3,000 residents, based on Office for National Statistics small-area and parish-level modelling data.

The population structure is characterised by a relatively high proportion of residents in professional and managerial occupations, reflecting commuting links to Derby and Burton upon Trent and the influence of the independent school sector.

== History ==
Archaeological evidence indicates human activity at Repton from the late Mesolithic and Neolithic periods. Cropmarks and enclosure features suggest continued occupation into the Roman and early Anglo-Saxon periods, reflecting long-term settlement in the Trent valley region.

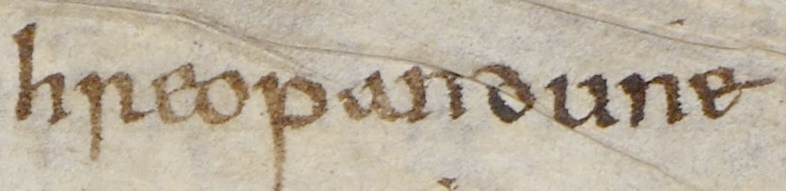
The Anglo-Saxon Chronicle records Hreopandune as the burial place of King Æthelbald

Christianity was reintroduced to the Midlands at Repton, where members of the Mercian royal family under Peada were baptised in AD 653. A double monastery under an abbess was subsequently established.

In 669 St Chad, Bishop of Mercia, transferred his episcopal see from Repton to Lichfield. Later, under King Offa, Lichfield briefly became an archiepiscopal centre, with Repton forming part of the ecclesiastical development that led to the short-lived archdiocese of Lichfield.

At the centre of the village is the Church of England parish church dedicated to Wystan (or Wigstan) of Mercia.

The Anglo-Saxon Chronicle records that in 873–874 the Great Heathen Army overwintered at Repton. Archaeological investigations led by Martin and Birthe Biddle identified a D-shaped earthwork and associated burials, though interpretations of its scale and function have since been debated.

Subsequent excavations by Cat Jarman and Mark Horton from 2015 onwards revealed additional structures and graves, including artefacts consistent with Viking activity.

A mass burial containing at least 264 individuals has been interpreted as linked to the Viking presence, with artefacts and radiocarbon evidence supporting a late 9th-century date.

An early account records that in the 17th century Thomas Walker uncovered a burial mound containing human remains, later associated with the same archaeological complex.

=== Modern history ===
Repton remained a predominantly rural settlement after the medieval period, with agriculture forming the basis of its economy. Parliamentary enclosure of Repton Common in 1766 formalised the redistribution of common land into private holdings.

In the 19th century, improved regional infrastructure transformed connectivity, particularly following the development of river crossings and the opening of nearby railway facilities at Willington in 1839. These changes supported the expansion of Repton School, which developed significantly under Steuart Adolphus Pears.

The historic core of Repton is now designated a conservation area reflecting its exceptional architectural and archaeological continuity.

== Parish church ==
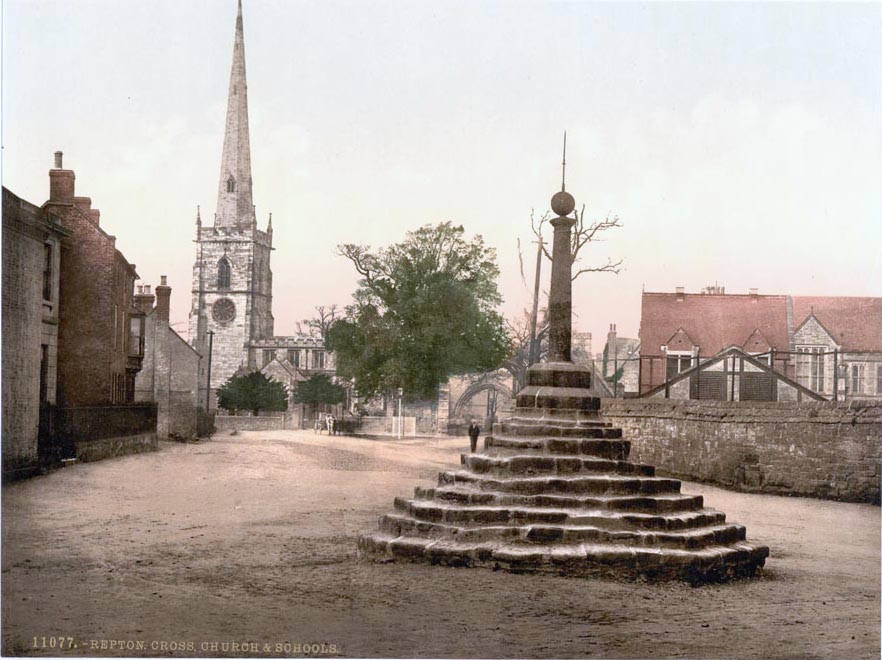
St Wystan's church and the cross in 1890

St Wystan's Church is an Anglo-Saxon parish church at the north edge of Repton and is designated a Grade I listed building by Historic England. It is dedicated to Saint Wystan (Wigstan), a Mercian royal prince later venerated as a saint.

The church is particularly noted for its Anglo-Saxon crypt, constructed in the 8th century AD and widely interpreted by architectural historians as a royal mausoleum associated with the Mercian dynasty, particularly during the reign of King Æthelbald of Mercia.

Within the crypt are traditionally associated burials of Æthelbald and King Wiglaf of Mercia, with the space later becoming associated with the cult of St Wystan. Wystan was murdered in 849 by his kinsman Beorhtfrith during the reign of Wiglaf, and later became the focus of a local saint’s cult, with Repton developing as a regional pilgrimage site in the late Anglo-Saxon period.

Miracles were attributed to the relics of St Wystan, reinforcing the church’s religious significance, although the scale and nature of pilgrimage activity remain matters of scholarly interpretation rather than documentary certainty.

It has been suggested that aspects of the crypt’s design may have influenced later medieval architectural schemes, including elements of royal liturgical space at Westminster Abbey under Henry III, although this remains a debated hypothesis based on proportional and stylistic comparisons rather than direct documentary evidence.

The cruciform Anglo-Saxon church itself has had several additions and restorations throughout its history. These include Medieval Gothic north and south aisles in the nave, rebuilt in the 13th century and widened early in the 14th century, and the addition in 1340 of the west tower and recessed spire. The church was restored between 1885 and 1886 by Arthur Blomfield.

== Notable people ==
This list includes individuals who were born in Repton, lived or died in the village, were buried at St Wystan's Church, or are otherwise strongly associated with its institutions.

=== Early medieval figures ===
- Æthelbald of Mercia (died 757), King of Mercia, traditionally associated with burial at Repton.
- Beornred of Mercia (died 757), briefly King of Mercia, also associated with burial at Repton in later tradition.
- Wiglaf of Mercia (died 839), King of Mercia, traditionally recorded as buried at Repton.
- Wigstan (died c. 840), Mercian prince and saint, buried at Repton before translation to Evesham Abbey.

=== Early modern and clerical figures ===
- Samuel Shaw (1635–1696), nonconformist minister associated with Repton.

=== Modern residents and public figures ===
- Walter Somers (1839–1917), engineer and industrialist who founded a forge and engineering company.
- John Auden (1894–1959), solicitor, deputy coroner for Staffordshire, First World War officer awarded the Military Cross, and natural history collector.
- Elsie Steele (1899–2010), resident of Repton in later life who lived at the Dales Residential Home; at the time of her death she was reported as one of the oldest documented people in Britain.
- Bob Roseveare (1923–2004), Second World War codebreaker at Bletchley Park and later schoolteacher.

=== Arts and entertainment ===
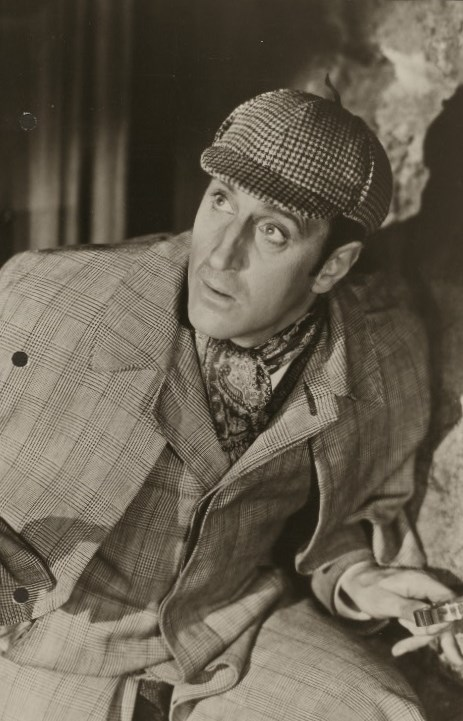
Basil Rathbone as Sherlock Holmes in the 1930s

- Basil Rathbone (1892–1967), actor best known for his portrayal of Sherlock Holmes, spent part of his childhood in Repton.

=== Sport ===
- Frederick Peach (1882–1965), cricketer who played for Derbyshire in 12 first-class matches.
- Neville Ford (1906–2000), cricketer who played in 75 first-class matches.
- Russell Osman (born 1959), professional footballer who made 595 league appearances, including 294 for Ipswich Town, and earned 11 caps for the England national football team.

== See also ==
- Listed buildings in Repton
- Repton School
- Anglo-Saxon architecture
- Great Heathen Army
- Danelaw

== Gallery ==
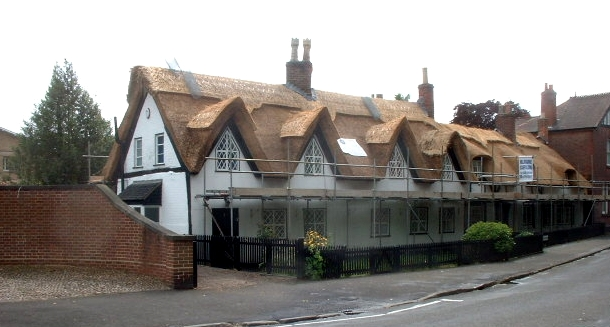
Thatching in progress, May 2007

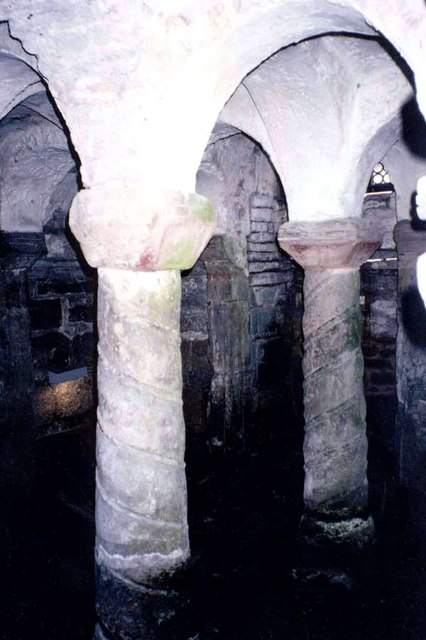
Crypt at St Wystan's Church

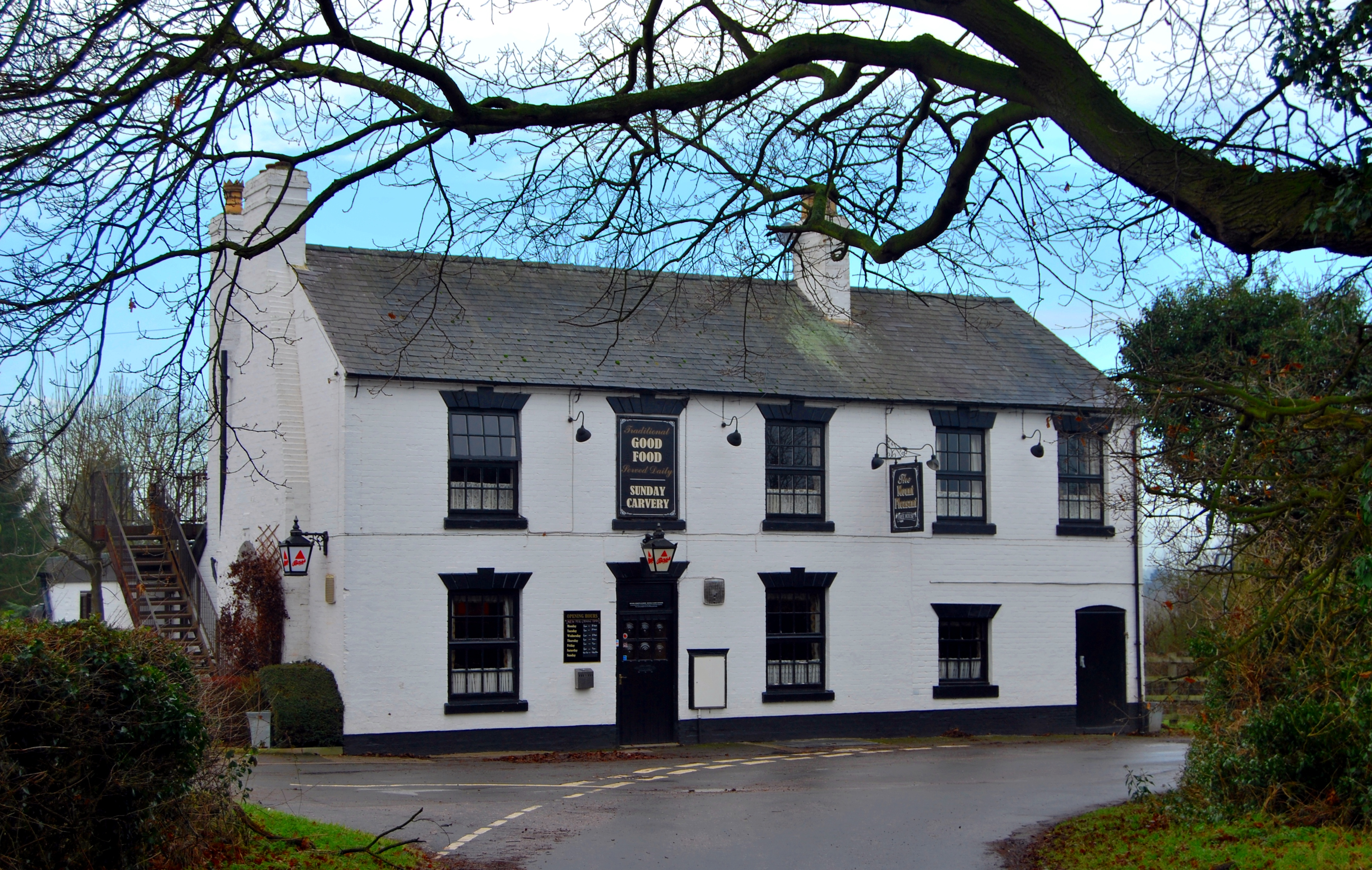
Mount Pleasant

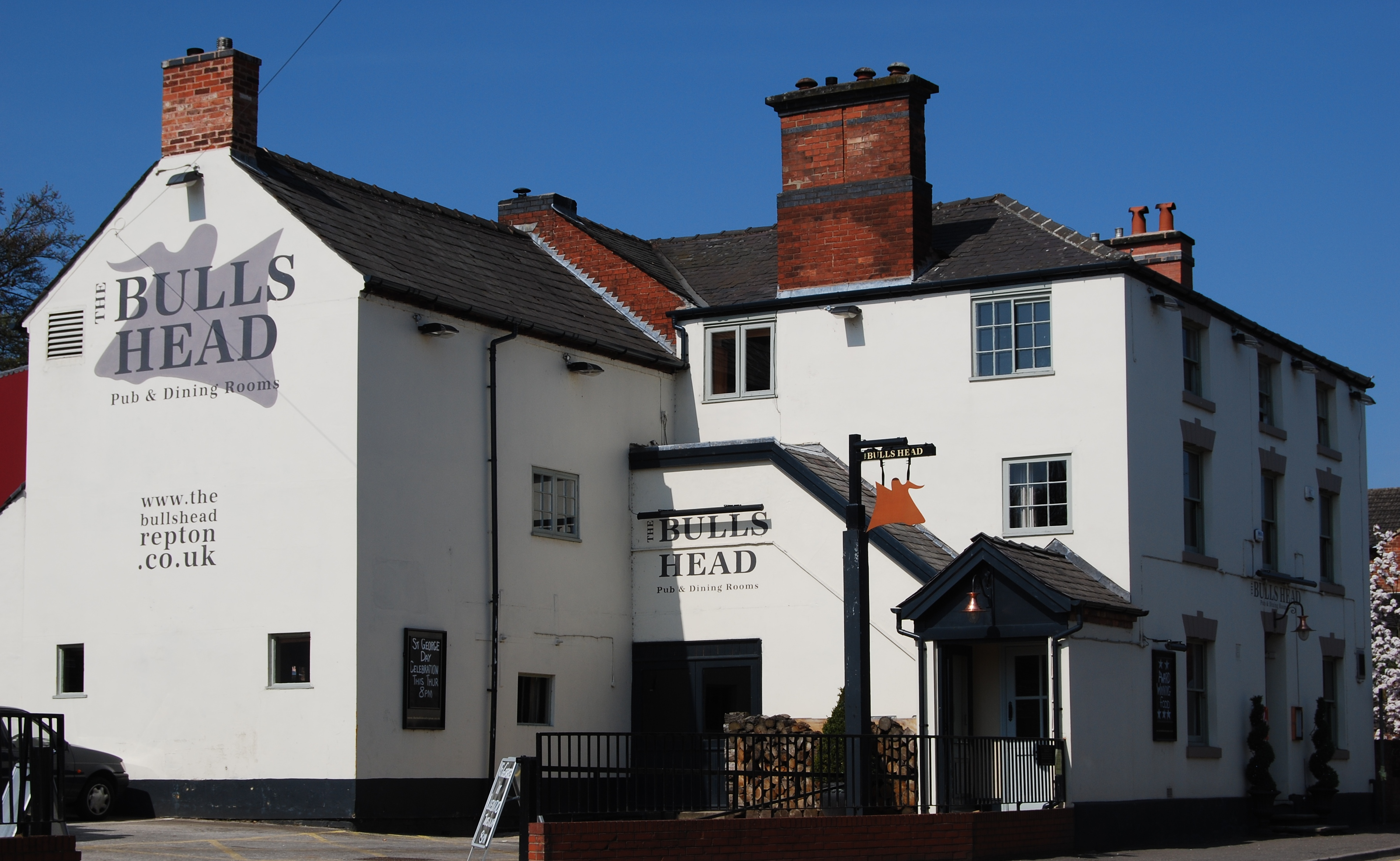
Bull's Head
