= Wiglaf of Mercia =

9th-century King of Mercia

Wiglaf
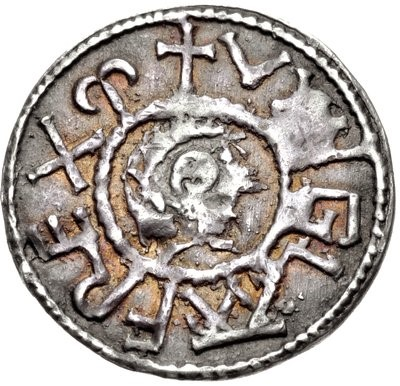
- Silver penny of Wiglaf, struck 827–829. Legend: + vviglaf rex m

King of Mercia
- First reign: 827–829
- Predecessor: Ludeca
- Successor: Ecgberht
- Second reign: 830–839
- Predecessor: Ecgberht
- Successor: Beorhtwulf
- Died: 839
- Burial: Repton Abbey
- Consort: Cynethryth
- Issue: Wigmund

Wiglaf (died 839) was King of Mercia from 827 to 829 and again from 830 until his death in 839. His ancestry is uncertain: the 820s were a period of dynastic conflict within Mercia and the genealogy of several of the kings of this time is unknown. Wigstan, his grandson, was later recorded as a descendant of Penda of Mercia, so it is possible that Wiglaf was descended from Penda, one of the most powerful seventh-century kings of Mercia.

Wiglaf succeeded Ludeca, who was killed campaigning against East Anglia. His first reign coincided with the continued rise of the rival Anglo-Saxon kingdom of Wessex under Ecgberht. Ecgberht drove Wiglaf from the throne in 829, and ruled Mercia directly for a year. Wiglaf recovered the kingdom in 830, probably by force, although it may be that Wiglaf remained subject to Ecgberht's overlordship. Mercia never regained the south-eastern kingdoms, but Berkshire and perhaps Essex came back into Mercian control. The causes of the fluctuating fortunes of Mercia and Wessex are a matter of speculation, but it may be that Carolingian support influenced both Ecgberht's ascendancy and the subsequent Mercian recovery. Although Wiglaf appeared to have restored Mercia's independence, the recovery was short-lived, and later in the century Mercia was divided between Wessex and the Vikings.

Wiglaf died in about 839, and was eventually succeeded by Beorhtwulf, though one tradition records his son, Wigmund as having reigned briefly. Wiglaf is buried at Repton, near Derby.

== Historical context ==
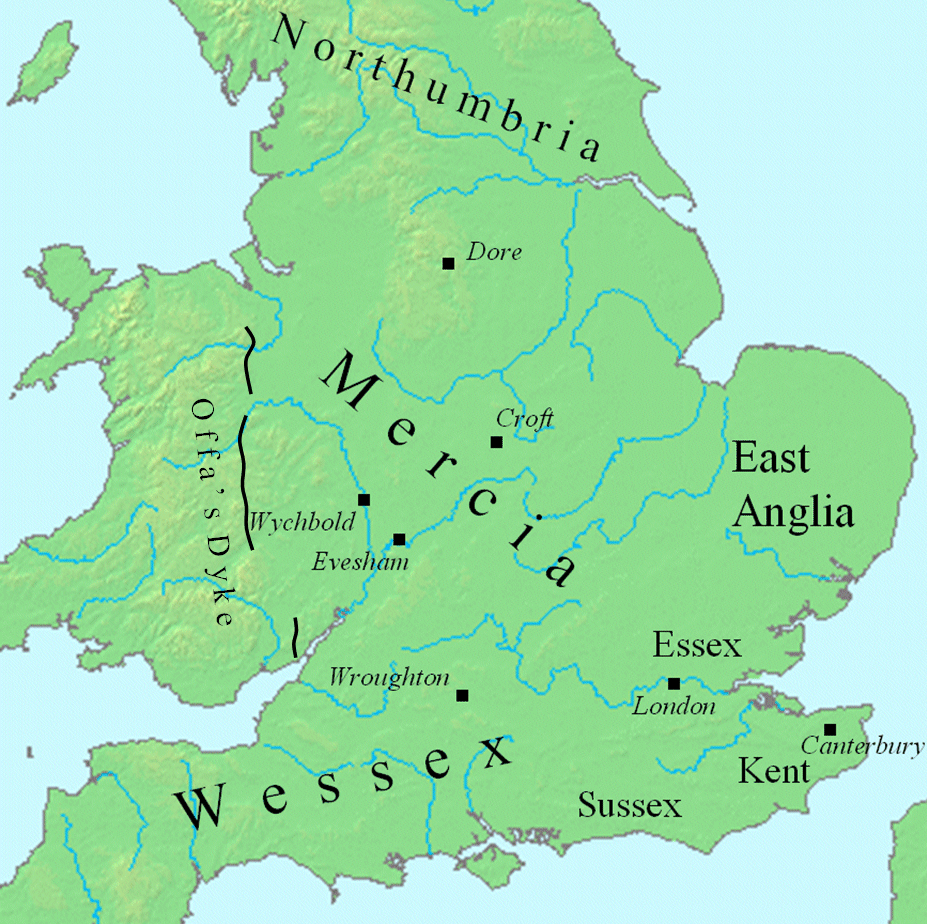
A map of what is now England during Wiglaf's reigns; the remnants of Offa's Dyke are shown, running roughly along the modern border between England and Wales.

Mercia had been the dominant Anglo-Saxon kingdom for most of the 8th century, with Offa, who died in 796, the most powerful king of his time. Coenwulf, who took the Mercian throne shortly after Offa's death, was able to retain Mercian influence in the kingdoms of Kent, East Anglia and Essex, and made frequent incursions across Offa's Dyke into what is now Wales. Coenwulf's death, in 821, marked the beginning of a period in which the political map of England was dramatically redrawn. Although one eleventh-century source claims that Coenwulf's son, Cynehelm, briefly succeeded to the throne, it is more likely that Ceolwulf, Coenwulf's brother, was the next king. He reigned for only two years before being deposed.

The next king, Beornwulf, was of no known royal line, though it has been conjectured on the basis of the common initial letter B that he was connected to the later kings Beorhtwulf and Burgred. It was probably Beornwulf whose defeat of the kingdom of Powys and destruction of the fortress of Deganwy are recorded in a Welsh chronicle, the Brut y Tywysogion, in 823, and it is clear that Mercia was still a formidable military power at that time. In 825 Beornwulf was decisively defeated by Ecgberht, King of Wessex, at the battle of Ellendun, and died the next year in an unsuccessful invasion of East Anglia. His successor, Ludeca, of unknown lineage, also invaded East Anglia, and, like Beornwulf, died while campaigning there, in 827. These defeats, in rapid succession, are likely to have exacerbated the apparent dynastic contention for Mercian royal authority. Outside Mercia, the power of the kingdom of Wessex to the south was strong and growing when Wiglaf came to the throne.

== Ancestry ==
Wiglaf's ancestry is not known for certain. There are two main theories regarding the ancestry of Mercian kings of this period. One is that descendants of different lines of the royal family competed for the throne. In the mid-7th century, for example, Penda had placed royal kinsmen in control of conquered provinces. A Wigheard, who witnessed a charter in the late 7th century, was possibly a member of this line. The other theory is that a number of kin-groups with local power-bases may have competed for the succession. The sub-kingdoms of the Hwicce, the Tomsæte, and the unidentified Gaini are examples of such power-bases. Marriage alliances could also have played a part. Competing magnates, those called in charters "dux" or "princeps" (that is, leaders), may have brought the kings to power. In this model, the Mercian kings are little more than leading noblemen.

A medieval tradition preserved at Evesham records that Wiglaf's grandson Wigstan was a descendant of Coenred, who was a grandson of Penda. Wigstan's grandfathers were Wiglaf and Ceolwulf I; the tradition might be interpreted to mean that Wiglaf descended from Penda, but it might also be Wiglaf's wife, Cynethryth, who was descended from Penda. Cynethryth's name is known from two of Wiglaf's charters, dated 831 and 836, and historian Pauline Stafford notes that her name "seems to hark back to the kin of Coenwulf if not earlier royal lines", but as with Wiglaf himself, nothing certain is known of her ancestry. A different connection is mentioned in the medieval Life of St. Wigstan, which asserts that the "B" and "W" families were related.

Known descendants of Wiglaf include his son, Wigmund, and his grandson, Wigstan, both of whom share the "Wig-" at the start of his name; alliterative family names are frequent in Anglo-Saxon dynasties and are often thought to suggest possible kinship. Other possible descendants of Wiglaf include the last Mercian king, Ceolwulf II. A large number of duces or praefecti (ealdormen) with similar names are found as witnesses in Mercian charters of the late 8th and early 9th centuries, including Wigbald, Wigberht, Wigcga, Wigferth, and Wigheard, but there is no evidence that these nobles were related beyond the similarity of their names.

== First reign and defeat by Wessex ==
The entry for 825 in the [C] manuscript of the Anglo-Saxon Chronicle, recording Wiglaf's accession.

The Anglo-Saxon Chronicle records Wiglaf's accession in the entry for 827 (erroneously recorded under the year 825). The entry reads "Her Ludecan Myrcna cing 7 his fif ealdormenn mid him man ofsloh, 7 Wiglaf feng to rice", which means "Here Ludeca, King of Mercia, was killed, and his five ealdormen with him, and Wiglaf succeeded to the kingdom". In 829, Ecgberht of Wessex successfully invaded Mercia and drove Wiglaf from his throne. The immediate consequence of Ecgberht's defeat of Beornwulf in 825 at the battle of Ellendun had been the loss of Mercian control over the south-eastern kingdoms of Kent, Sussex, Essex and East Anglia; Beornwulf's and Ludeca's disastrous military expeditions against East Anglia in 826 and 827 also confirmed Mercia's loss of control of that kingdom. Ecgberht's defeat of Wiglaf in 829 completed his domination of southern England, and Ecgberht went on to receive the submission of Eanred of Northumbria at Dore, on the northern border of Mercia, later that year. These events led the anonymous scribe who wrote the Anglo-Saxon Chronicle to describe Ecgberht as the eighth bretwalda, or 'Ruler of Britain'.

Ecgberht remained in control of Mercia until some time in 830. He was in power there long enough to issue coins (struck in London) bearing the title "Rex M", for "Rex Merciorum", or "King of Mercia".

== Second reign ==
The Chronicle reports that in 830, Wiglaf "obtained the kingdom of Mercia again". Wiglaf's return to the throne has generally been taken by historians to indicate the end of Ecgberht's overlordship of Mercia. In particular, historian Frank Stenton argued that the wording of the Chronicle makes it probable that Wiglaf recovered the kingdom by force, and that if Ecgberht had given the kingdom to Wiglaf this would have been recorded. A charter of 836 has also been cited as evidence that Wiglaf was acting as an independent ruler at that time; it records a council at Croft, in Leicestershire, attended by the Archbishop of Canterbury and eleven bishops, including some from West Saxon sees. Wiglaf refers to the assembly as "my bishops, duces, and magistrates", indicating not only a recovery of control over his own territory, but some level of authority over the southern church. It is significant that Wiglaf was still able to call together such a group of notables; the West Saxons, even if they were able to do so, held no such councils. Essex, which had been a Mercian dependency, may have been brought back under Mercian overlordship: a King Sigeric of the East Saxons, described as a minister of Wiglaf's, witnessed a charter in Hertfordshire at some point between 829 and 837. London, where Ecgberht apparently lost control of the mint, remained a Mercian town through Wiglaf's second reign and beyond. Berkshire also appears to have returned to Mercian control, though it is possible that this did not occur until after Wiglaf's reign. Perhaps more surprisingly, given the new strength of Wessex, it appears that the territory along the middle Thames which had formed the heartland of the Gewisse (the precursor people of the 9th-century West Saxon state) remained firmly in Mercian hands. In the west, either Wiglaf or his successor, Beorhtwulf, brought the Welsh back under Mercian control at some point prior to 853, when a rebellion against Mercia is recorded.

A charter of 831, which Wiglaf calls "the first year of my second reign", was issued at Wychbold near Droitwich; it is significant that Wiglaf makes no reference to any overlordship of Ecgberht's in this charter, issued within a year of his recovery of power, and that he acknowledges his temporary deposition. In East Anglia, King Æthelstan minted coins, possibly as early as 827, but more likely c. 830 after Ecgberht's influence was reduced with Wiglaf's return to power in Mercia. This demonstration of independence on East Anglia's part is not surprising, as it was probably Æthelstan who was responsible for the defeat and death of both Beornwulf and Ludeca.

Both Wessex's sudden rise to power in the late 820s, and the subsequent failure to retain this dominant position, have been examined by historians looking for underlying causes. Dynastic uncertainty has been suggested as the reason for Mercia's collapse; the 820s were certainly years of instability in the royal line. The lack of detailed information about Mercian and Wessex administration makes other theories hard to evaluate: for example, it has been suggested that the West Saxons had a stable tributary system that contributed to its success, or that Wessex's mixed Saxon and British population, natural frontiers, and capable administrators were key factors.

Another proposed explanation for the events of these years is that Wessex's fortunes were to some degree dependent on Carolingian support. The Rhenish and Frankish commercial networks collapsed at some time in the 820s or 830s, and in addition, a rebellion broke out in February 830 against Louis the Pious, the first of a series of internal conflicts that lasted through the 830s and beyond. These distractions may have reduced Louis's ability to support Ecgberht. In this view, the withdrawal of Frankish influence would have left East Anglia, Mercia and Wessex to find a balance of power not dependent on outside aid.

Wiglaf's recovery was not complete. Ecgberht's influence was certainly reduced after 830, but Mercia never recovered control of the south-east, except possibly for Essex, and East Anglia remained independent. It appears that Wulfred, the archbishop of Canterbury at the time of Ecgberht's victory, remained loyal to Mercia: his coinage terminates when Ecgberht's Kentish coinage begins; and, since a charter of 838 shows Ecgberht agreeing to return property to the church in Canterbury, it is evident that he had seized property from the church earlier. Æthelwulf, Ecgberht's son, was king of Kent during his father's reign, and fear of continuing Mercian influence in Kent may have been the reason he gave estates to Christ Church, Canterbury.

== Coinage and charters ==
Coins from Wiglaf's reign are very rare. They can be divided into portrait and non-portrait types, and, of these, only the two non-portrait coins may be from Wiglaf's second reign. Other than these, there is no evidence of any Mercian coinage until the reign of Wiglaf's successor, Beorhtwulf, which began in about 840. This may show that Wiglaf remained subject to Ecgberht's overlordship after 830, though most historians consider Wiglaf to have recovered his independence at that time.

Charters survive from Wiglaf's reign; these were documents which granted land to followers or to churchmen, and were witnessed by the kings who had power to grant the land. One such charter of Wiglaf's, granting privileges to the monastery of Hanbury in 836, does not exempt the monks from the duty of constructing ramparts, indicating a concern for defence. Wessex charters do not begin to show such exemptions until 846. These clauses are explained by the increasing Viking presence throughout Britain: Viking raids had begun at least as early as 793, Viking armies were in Kent by 811, and from 835 Viking raids were a concern for the kings of Wessex.

The 836 charter also contains an early reference to the trimoda necessitas, the set of three obligations that kings of the era placed on their subjects. These duties were the building of royal residences, the obligation to pay feorm, or food rent, to the king, and hospitality to the king's servants. The privileges granted came at a cost: Wiglaf and one ealdorman received life interests in estates, and another ealdorman was paid six hundred shillings in gold. It is perhaps notable that, in common with many other Mercian charters of the 9th century, this grant is of privileges rather than land: the chronicler Bede had commented a century earlier that excessive grants of land to monasteries were leaving kings without land to grant to the nobility, and the Mercian kings may have been responding to this problem.

== Succession ==
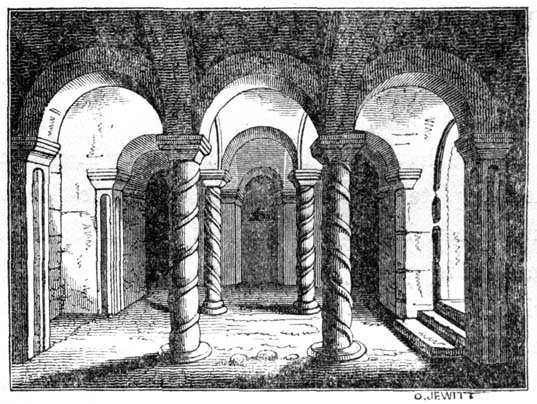
A 19th-century engraving of the crypt at Repton where Wiglaf was interred.

The date of Wiglaf's death is not given directly in any of the primary sources, but it can be determined from the known chronology of his successors. The Anglo-Saxon Chronicle records that Burgred was driven out of Mercia by the Vikings in 874, after a reign of twenty-two years, and charter evidence indicates that Burgred succeeded in the first half of 852. A regnal list credits his predecessor, Beorhtwulf, with a reign of thirteen years, which is consistent with date references in his charters. Hence it would appear that Wiglaf's reign ended in 839. A tradition records the death of Wigstan in 849, and refers to Wigstan's father, Wigmund, the son of Wiglaf, as having been king, but this is the only evidence for Wigmund having reigned and must be regarded with suspicion. The descent of Beorhtwulf is not known, but it appears that dynastic tension was a continuing factor in the Mercian succession, in contrast to Wessex, where Ecgberht established a dynasty that lasted with little disturbance throughout the 9th century.

Wiglaf was buried at Repton, in a crypt which still can be seen. The monastery church on the site at that time was probably constructed by Æthelbald of Mercia to house the royal mausoleum; other burials there include that of Wigstan, Wiglaf's grandson. The vault and columns in the crypt are not original and may date from Wiglaf's time rather than Aethelbald's.

== See also ==
- Kings of Mercia family tree
