= Wigstan =

9th-century Mercian royal and saint

Saint Wigstan (Wystan, Wistan)

Martyr
- Died: c. 839/840
- Honored in: Roman Catholic Church; Anglican Communion; Eastern Orthodox Church
- Major shrine: Evesham Abbey (destroyed)
- Feast: 1 June

Wigstan (/ˈwiːstɑːn/, Old English pronunciation: [ˈwiːjˌstɑːn]; died c. 840 AD), also known as Saint Wystan, was the son of Wigmund of Mercia and Ælfflæd, daughter of King Ceolwulf I of Mercia.

== History ==
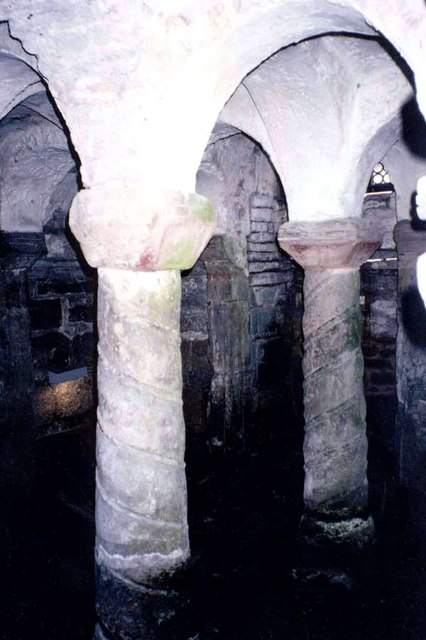
The crypt in St Wystan's Church, Repton, Derbyshire, where Wigstan was originally buried

Like many Mercians of the period very little is known about Wigstan. He was the son of Wigmund and Ælfflæd, both the offspring of Mercian kings, Wiglaf and Ceolwulf I respectively. Wigmund, according to the Croyland Chronicle, died of dysentery before his father King Wiglaf, making Wigstan heir to the kingdom of Mercia. However, when Wiglaf died c.839, Wigstan declined the kingship preferring religious life and monastic orders instead. Beorhtwulf, possibly Wigstan's great-uncle, became king instead. William of Malmesbury claims that Beorhtwulf's son, Beorhtfrith, wished to marry Wigstan's widowed mother, Ælfflæd, but Wigstan forbade the union as they were too closely related. As revenge Beorhtfrith went to visit the young King ostensibly in peace but, when the two greeted each other, he struck Wigstan on the head with the shaft of his dagger and his servant ran him through with his sword.

Beorhtfrith, son of Beorhtwulf, king of Mercia, unjustly put to death his cousin, St Wigstan on the Kalends of June [1st June], being the eve of Pentecost. He was grandson of two of the kings of Mercia; his father, Wigmund, being the son of King Wiglaf, and his mother, Ælfflæd, the daughter of King Ceolwulf. His corpse was carried to a monastery which was famous in that age, called Repton, and buried in the tomb of his grandfather, King Wiglaf. Miracles from heaven were not wanting in testimony of his martyrdom; for a column of light shot up to heaven from the spot where the innocent saint was murdered, and remained visible to the inhabitants of that place for 30 days.

— Florence of Worcester

== Veneration ==
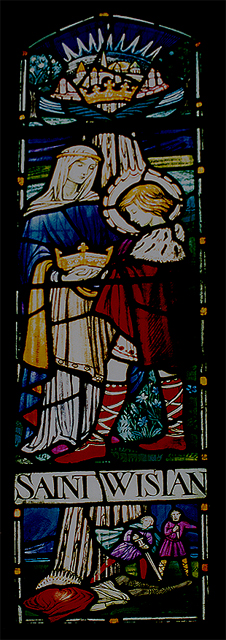
Saint Wistan, Holy Trinity Church, Wistanstow

The site of Wigstan's martyrdom has been variously claimed to be Wistanstow, Shropshire, and Wistow, Leicestershire, with Wigston being the nearest town which happens to be derived from his name.

Wigston was one of the places where the body of St Wigstan remained overnight on the way to Repton for burial. A small shrine was set up to honour him, which became the site of an annual pilgrimage on the saint's feast day. It was replaced by a chapel in 1086, which, in turn was replaced by a church, now closed.

Wigstan became a famous saint and Repton became a centre of pilgrimage as a result, which led Cnut the Great to move Wigstan's relics to Evesham, where the Vita Sancti Wistani was written by Dominic of Evesham, a medieval prior there.

The saint's relics were relocated to the Abbey at Evesham. His vita (meaning "life", a history recording reputed acts of sanctity) has been attributed to the Benedictine chronicler Dominic of Evesham, an early 12th-century Prior at Evesham. The edifice of the abbey (including the tomb of the four saints and many monastic buildings) were demolished during the Dissolution of the Monasteries.

Noted Edwardian artist Margaret E.A. Rope was commissioned for the windows in the parish church of Wistanstow in Shropshire dedicated depicting SS Wistan and Anne.

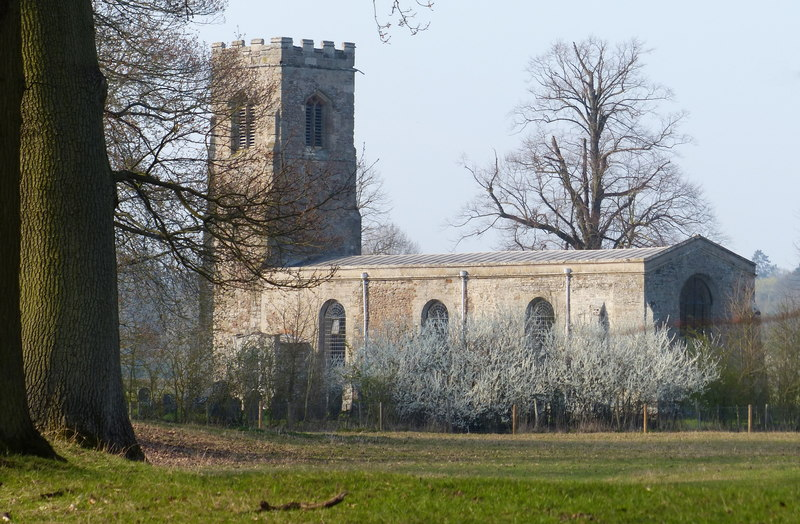
St Wistan's Church, Wistow

== St Wistan’s Way ==
St Wistan's Way is a four-mile pilgrimage starting at the medieval church of St. Wistan's in Wistow and proceeding over the Grand Union Canal to Wigston.

== See also ==
- Anglo-Saxon crypt tomb at Repton, Derbyshire
- British poet W. H. Auden was named in honor of Saint Wystan, A family connection with both Repton School and Wistanstow church in Shropshire is noted by Auden's biographer Humphrey Carpenter.
- Mick Sharp's book The Way and the Light: An Illustrated Guide to the Saints and Holy Places of Britain makes the case for Wistow as the likely location of St Wistan's martyrdom, attested to in the legend of the miraculous appearance of human hair on the anniversary of his death, 1 June.

== Sources ==
- Jennings, J. C. (April 1962). "The Writings of Prior Dominic of Evesham". The English Historical Review. 77 (303): 298–304. doi:10.1093/ehr/LXXVII.CCCIII.298.
- Walker, Ian, Mercia and the Making of England.
- Yorke, Barbara, Kings and Kingdoms of Early Anglo-Saxon England. London: Seaby, 1990. ISBN 1-85264-027-8
- Zaluckij, Sarah, Mercia: the Anglo-Saxon Kingdom of Central England. Logaston: Logaston Press, 2001. ISBN 1-873827-62-8
