= Cookham Abbey =

Monastery in Berkshire, England

Coordinates: 51.561126°N 0.707551°W

Cookham Abbey was an Anglo-Saxon monastery in Berkshire, England. It was established by 726.

== History ==
Situated south of the Thames, Cookham was traditionally part of Wessex, but being near a Roman crossing point the abbey was captured in 733 by Æthelbald of Mercia. At some point between 740 and 757, Æthelbald gave the monastery with its deeds to Christ Church, (Canterbury Cathedral). After the death of Archbishop Cuthbert in 760, the deeds were stolen by two of the archbishop's pupils, Daegheah and Osbert, and given to Cynewulf of Wessex, who took possession of the monastery. In 779 after the Battle of Bensington, Offa of Mercia once again took the monastery and the missing deeds became a cause of much dissension, often mentioned in church councils. Before he died in 786, Cynewulf sent the deeds back to Canterbury in an act of penance.

After Offa's death in 796, his widow Cynethryth became the abbess. At the synod of Clofesho, which took place somewhere in Mercia in 798, the archbishop Æthelhard produced the deeds, and obtained the agreement of all, that the monastery rightly belonged to Canterbury. Æthelhard then immediately gave the monastery to Cynethryth in return for various pieces of land that she owned in Kent, able to support 160 households. Thus peace was reestablished between Mercia and Kent.

In August 2021, archaeologists from the University of Reading announced the discovery of a monastery dating to the reign of Queen Cynethryth in the grounds of Holy Trinity Church. Finds included food remains, pottery vessels used for cooking and eating, a fine bronze bracelet and a dress pin.
