= Ælfthryth of Crowland =

9th-century English saint, virgin and recluse

Saint Ælfthryth of Crowland
- Born: unknown England
- Died: c.835 Crowland, England
- Venerated in: Eastern orthodox church, Roman Catholic Church
- Canonized: Pre-congregation
- Major shrine: Crowland
- Feast: 2 August

Ælfthryth, also known as Alfreda, Alfritha, Aelfnryth, or Etheldritha, is a Mercian princess, saint, virgin, and recluse, venerated in both the Catholic Church and Antiochian Orthodox Church. She was a daughter of King Offa of Mercia and his consort, Cynethryth.

Ælfthryth was "either betrothed to or loved by" Æthelberht II, the king of the East Angles. Æthelberht was murdered in 793 while visiting Ælfthryth. The chronicler John of Worcester, writing in the 12th century, places the blame on Ælfthryth's mother Cynethryth, the deed purportedly being committed so that her brother could ascend to the throne instead. Medieval chroniclers such as Roger of Wendover, Matthew Paris and John Brompton have been unwilling to cast any blame on King Offa, who founded monasteries, gave land to the church and travelled on pilgrimage to Rome.

Ælfthryth was horrified by the murder, so she departed the court and retired to the Crowland Abbey in the Fens of Crowland, where she lived as a recluse for 40 years, until her death of natural causes in 835. Ælfthryth's sister Aelfreda also lost a husband due to their parents' political intrigue.

According to the Oxford Dictionary of Saints, Ælfthryth was "famous for her prophecies". Her tomb was arranged around St Guthlac's. A Crowland tradition states that Ælfthryth's relics were destroyed in 870 when Danes destroyed the abbey, but there is little evidence for it. Her feast day is 2 August.
