= Heardberht =

Heardberht of Mercia was the brother of King Æthelbald (reigned 716–757), son of Alweo, and a leading Mercian ealdorman. In surviving charters, between at least 736 and 757, Heardberht features as a witness to at least seven, and he is described as the king's brother in two.

Attesting as dux, praefectus and perhaps auxiliator, he was one of the leading ealdormen of Æthelbald's reign, and part of a regular king's council or witan. He often features alongside Bercol, perhaps the most senior ealdorman or patricius, ealdorman Offa (14 charter appearances), Wilfrid (6 appearances), Eadberht (6 appearances), Sigebed (6 appearances), Cyneberht (4 appearances), Ealdwulf (3 appearances) and Eadbald (3 appearances).

Unusually, Heardberht appears to have survived his brother to appear as a witness to a charter in 757 also witnessed by King Offa (reigned 757-796), a successor monarch to his brother.
