= Bensington =

Bensington may refer to:

- The Battle of Bensington, a major battle between Offa's Mercia and the West Saxons in 779 AD
- The former name of Benson, Oxfordshire, England, a village where the battle possibly took place
