= Cynethryth =

Queen consort of Mercia (died after 798)

- Queen consort of Mercia
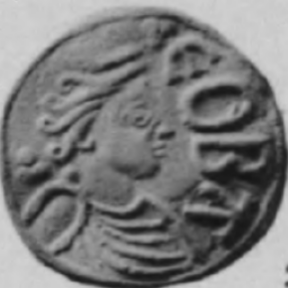
- Portrait penny of Cynethryth, minted by Eoba at Canterbury. Cynethryth is the only Anglo-Saxon queen known to have had coins issued in her name and these are unique in Western Europe of the period. Coin held by the British Museum.
- Died: after 798
- Spouse: Offa of Mercia
- Issue: Ecgfrith, King of Mercia; Eadburh, Queen of Wessex; Ælfflæd, Queen of Northumbria; Æthelburh; Æthelswith

Cynethryth (Cyneðryð; died after AD 798) was a Queen of Mercia, wife of King Offa of Mercia and mother of King Ecgfrith of Mercia. Cynethryth is the only Anglo-Saxon queen consort in whose name coinage was definitely issued.

== Biography ==
=== Origins ===
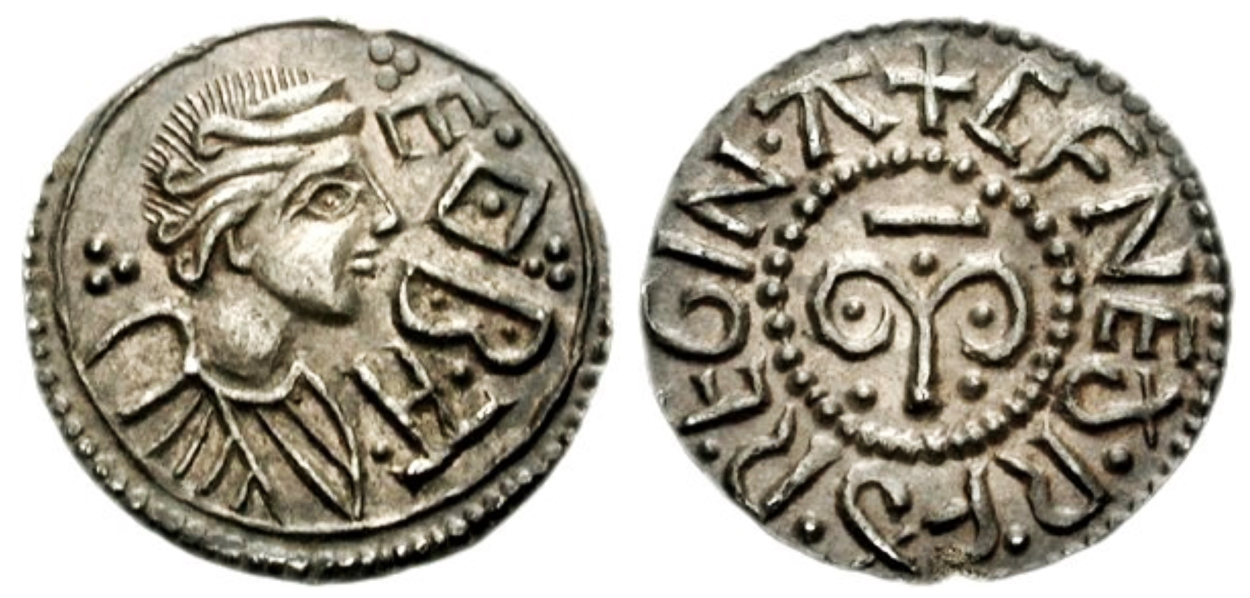
Penny of Cynethryth, wife of king Offa (1.29 g)

Nothing certain is known of Cynethryth's origins. Her name (lit. 'royal strength') recalls the wife and daughters of King Penda—Cynewise, Cyneburh, and Cyneswith—which may indicate that she was a descendant of Penda.

A tradition related by the 13th century Vitae duorum Offarum tells that she was of Frankish origin, and that for her crimes she was condemned by Charlemagne's justice system to be set adrift at sea in an open boat. The boat eventually stranded on the Welsh coast where she was taken to Offa. She pleaded that she had been cruelly persecuted and was of the Carolingian royal house. Offa left Drida, as she was called, in the charge of Marcellina, his mother. Offa would fall in love with and marry her, at which point she adopted the name Quindrida, but she continued in her iniquitous ways before being murdered by robbers. This seems to relate to a brief mention of Offa's sinful but reformed wife, Thritha, that appears in Beowulf, but also has aspects similar to a story told of the wife of Offa of Angel, a Yorkshire girl set adrift by her father.

Unlike the relations of Offa's predecessor Æthelbald, which had been condemned by the church, the marriage of Offa and Cynethryth was entirely conventional and met with the approval of the church hierarchy. In a letter to Cynethryth and Offa's son Ecgfrith, Alcuin advises him to follow the example of his parents, including his mother's piety. Elsewhere Alcuin refers to Cynethryth as "controller of the Royal household".

=== Queen of the Mercians ===
The date of Offa and Cynethryth's marriage is not known, but it was not until after the birth of Ecgfrith that Cynethryth began to witness charters. She first witnessed a charter dated 770, along with Ecgfrith and Ælfflæd. By 780 she is Cyneðryð Dei gratia regina Merciorum ("Cynethryth, by the Grace of God, Queen of the Mercians").

It has been suggested that Cynethryth's coinage was in emulation of the Byzantine Empress Irene, who ruled during this time through her son Constantine VI. The imagery employed, however, does not follow that on Irene's coinage, but that used on coins of late Roman empresses, just as the image used on Offa's coins show him as a late Roman emperor. It has been suggested that the coins were minted for donations by Cynethryth to the Church, but their similarity to the general issues suggests otherwise. This coinage is unique in Anglo-Saxon England, and indeed in Western Europe in this period.

Cynethryth is associated with her husband in charters and is said to have been a patron of Chertsey Abbey. Pope Adrian I, when elevating Higbert's Bishopric of Lichfield to an Archbishopric, wrote to Offa and Cynethryth jointly.

=== Allegations regarding the death of St Æthelberht of East Anglia ===
Æthelberht II, King of East Anglia (died 20 May 794) – who was later canonised as Saint Ethelbert the King – is widely believed to have been assassinated, on Offa's orders.

Some later chroniclers, such as Roger of Wendover, have alleged that Cynethryth was either personally responsible for the assassination of Æthelberht, or to have incited Offa to kill him.

=== Later entry into religious order ===
After Offa's death in 796, Cynethryth entered a religious order. She became abbess of the monastery at Cookham and also had charge of the church at Bedford, where Offa was interred. It is thought that she may be buried at Cookham, and ongoing archaeological research at the site by the University of Reading is studying this possibility.

Cynethryth was alive as late as 798, when a dispute over church lands with Æthelhard, Archbishop of Canterbury, was settled at the Synod of Clofesho, at an uncertain location.

== Family ==
Family tree of Cynethryth

King Offa had at least five children, and it is thought that they were all Cynethryth's as well; they were:

- Ecgfrith (died 796) - King of Mercia, died after a reign of only 141 days.
- Eadburh - Queen of Wessex, wife of Beorhtric of Wessex.
- Ælfflæd - Queen of Northumbria, wife of Æthelred I of Northumbria.
- Æthelburh - An abbess.
- Æthelswith - possibly Ælfthryth of Crowland.

== Recent discoveries ==
In August 2021, archaeologists headed by Gabor Thomas from the University of Reading announced the discovery of a monastery dated back to the reign of Queen Cynethryth in the grounds of Holy Trinity Church in the village of Cookham in Berkshire. According to Gabor Thomas, items including food remains, pottery vessels used for cooking and eating, a fine bronze bracelet and a dress pin will help to make a detailed impression of how the monks and nuns ate, dressed, worked and lived here.

== Bibliography ==
- "Anglo-Saxon Charters homepage". Archived from the original on 1 June 2005.
- Dümmler, Ernst, Epistolae Karolini aevi, Tomus II. (Monumenta Germaniae Historica, Epistolarum, Tomus IV) Berlin: Weidmann, 1895. (Available at dMGH)
- Kelly, S.E. (2004). "Cynethryth". Oxford Dictionary of National Biography.
- Keynes, Simon, "Cynethryth" in M. Lapidge et al. (eds), The Blackwell Encyclopedia of Anglo-Saxon England. Blackwell, London, 1999. ISBN 0-631-22492-0
- Miller, Sean. "Anglo-Saxons.net".
- Shippey, Tom (Summer 2001). "Wicked Queens and Cousin Strategies in Beowulf and Elsewhere". The Heroic Age, Volume 5. Archived from the original on 23 November 2007.
- Stafford, Pauline, "Political Women in Mercia, Eighth to Early Tenth Centuries" in Michelle P. Brown & Carol A. Farr (eds), Mercia, an Anglo-Saxon kingdom in Europe. Leicester: Leicester University Press, 2001. ISBN 0-8264-7765-8
- Thacker, Alan, "Kings, Saints and Monasteries in pre-Viking Mercia" in Midland History, volume 10 (1985). ISSN 0047-729X
- Williams, Gareth, "Mercian Coinage and Authority" in Michelle P. Brown & Carol A. Farr (eds), Mercia, an Anglo-Saxon kingdom in Europe. Leicester: Leicester University Press, 2001. ISBN 0-8264-7765-8
- Yorke, Barbara, "The Origins of Mercia" in Michelle P. Brown & Carol A. Farr (eds), Mercia, an Anglo-Saxon kingdom in Europe. Leicester: Leicester University Press, 2001. ISBN 0-8264-7765-8
