= Husmerae =

Anglo-Saxon tribe

The Husmerae were a tribe or clan in early medieval England, possibly forming an early settlement of the Hwicce subkingdom. Charter evidence also referred to the group as Wiogorna and was also considered a prouvincia or provincia, an administrative division with its own territorial boundaries. An account also refer to the Husmerae territory as a regio.

== History ==
The Husmerae settled on the banks of the River Stour prior to 736. They probably took their name from Usmere, a pool on the boundary of Wolverley whose name in preserved in Ismere House in Churchill, Worcestershire. A source cited that the term was derived from British word udso, Welsh ws (water) and Old English mere.

The tribe is mentioned only in the Ismere Diploma of 734, and subsequent charters relating to the same property until 964, when Usmere occurs on the boundary of Cookley in Wolverley. This charter was for the foundation of a coenubium (minster). That minster was probably at Kidderminster, quite probably occupying the site of the parish church there.

Although the Husmerae may have been of West Saxon origin, settling into the area some time after the West Saxon defeat of the Britons at the Battle of Dyrham in 577, the Ismere Diploma suggests that Husmerae is the ancient name for area, although uncertainty over its provenance leave the origins of the name open to question. It was specifically referred to as the province south of the Mercian heartlands and was considered an extensive folk territory. A historical description cited it as the area next to the River Stour in a charter records that detailed a grant by King Æthelbald of Mercia to build a monastery in the location.
