= Beornred of Mercia =

King of Mercia in 757

Beornred

King of Mercia
- Reign: 757
- Predecessor: Æthelbald
- Successor: Offa
- Died: 757
- House: Unknown

Beornred (Old English: Beornrǣd) (? – 757) was a Mercian Thane who was briefly King of Mercia in 757. Beornred ascended the throne following the murder of King Æthelbald. However, he was defeated by Offa and forced to flee the country, and was killed that same year. There is very little information about him, and the mentions of him are commonly brief.

According to the Anglo-Saxon Chronicle, in 757: "...Æthelbald, king of Mercia, was killed at Seckington, and his body rests at Repton; and he ruled 41 years. And then Beornred succeeded to the kingdom, and held it a little while and unhappily; and that same year Offa put Beornred to flight and succeeded to the kingdom, and held it for 39 years..." According to Ingulf, an 11th-century Benedictine abbot, Beornred was regarded as a tyrant, while Roger of Wendover, a 13th-century chronicler, states that he was an unjust king and that the people of Mercia rose in rebellion against him. He was possibly involved in his predecessor's death. According to Professor Michelle P. Brown, Beornred has been considered by some historians to have been part of the same dynasty as Beorhtric of Wessex, as well as several other prominent Anglo-Saxon nobles whose names begin with the letter B.

== See also ==
- Kings of Mercia family tree

Titles of nobility
Preceded by Æthelbald	King of Mercia; 757	Succeeded by Offa
