= Ælfflæd of Mercia =

Queen consort of Northumbria, married in 792

Ælfflæd

Queen consort of Northumbria
- Tenure: 792–796
- Spouse: Æthelred I of Northumbria (m. 792)
- Father: Offa of Mercia
- Mother: Cynethryth

A mention of Ælfflæd in the Anglo-Saxon Chronicle

Ælfflæd was a daughter of Offa of Mercia and Cynethryth.

She may have witnessed a charter with her father, mother, and brother Ecgfrith in the 770s. She certainly witnessed a charter in 787 with her mother, father, brother, and two sisters; here she is described as virgo—unmarried.

It is possible that she was the daughter of Offa whose proposed marriage to Charles the Younger caused a dispute between Charlemagne and Offa in around 789–790.

In 792 she married Æthelred I of Northumbria at Catterick. Here she is described as "queen", which has suggested to some historians that she had been previously married, and to a king, perhaps to one of Æthelred's predecessors.
