= Bercol =

Ealdorman in the reign of King Æthelbald of Mercia

Bercol of Mercia was a leading ealdorman in the reign of King Æthelbald of Mercia (reigned 716-757). Attesting charters from 716, in his last dated 749 he is described as patricius, indicating he was the king's most senior ealdorman. An ealdorman named Offa earlier had this title, as given in a witness list from 742.

From the surviving four charters his status is also given as comes and dux, such as during his attendance at the Council of Clovesho in 742.
