= Sigeberht of Wessex =

King of Wessex c. 754–756

Sigeberht

King of Wessex
- Reign: c. 754 – c. 756
- Predecessor: Cuthred
- Successor: Cynewulf
- Died: c. 756
- House: Wessex

Sigeberht (meaning roughly "Magnificent Victory") was the King of Wessex from 754 or 755, to around 756.

Sigeberht succeeded his distant relative Cuthred, but was then accused of acting unjustly. After ruling a year he was accused of unlawful acts and removed from power by the witan or council of nobles. This council was led by Cynewulf who succeeded Sigeberht. Sigeberht was given control of Hampshire. There, he was accused of murdering an Anglo-Saxon ealdorman named Cumbra, driven out and ultimately killed. Traditionally he was stabbed to death by a local herdsman in revenge for Cumbra's killing. It is possible that this happened under the influence of Æthelbald of Mercia. His brother, Cyneheard the Ætheling, was also driven out but returned in 786 to kill Sigeberht's successor Cynewulf.

== See also ==
- House of Wessex family tree

Regnal titles
Preceded by Cuthred	King of Wessex; 756–757	Succeeded by Cynewulf
