= Eadburh =

Queen of Wessex from 789 to 802

Queen consort of Wessex
- Tenure: 789–802
- Spouse: Beorhtric of Wessex
- House: Iclingas
- Father: Offa of Mercia
- Mother: Cynethryth

Eadburh (Old English: Ēadburh), also spelled Eadburg, (fl. 787–802) was the daughter of King Offa of Mercia and Queen Cynethryth. She was the wife of King Beorhtric of Wessex, and according to Asser's Life of Alfred the Great she killed her husband by poison while attempting to poison another. She fled to Francia, where she is said to have been offered the chance of marrying Charlemagne, but ruined the opportunity. Instead she was appointed as the abbess of a convent. Here she is said to have fornicated with an English exile. As a result, she was eventually expelled from the monastery and ended her days begging in the streets of Pavia.

== Family ==
Eadburh was the daughter of King Offa and Queen Cynethryth. She was one of five children, four of them girls; they all witnessed a charter in 787.

== Queen ==
Eadburh married Beorhtric, king of Wessex from 787 to 802, in 789. Offa was then the most powerful king in England, and Beorhtric gained his support as a result of the marriage. According to Asser, Eadburh became all powerful, and often demanded the executions or exile of her enemies. She was also alleged to have assassinated those men whom she couldn't compel Beorhtric to kill through poisoning their food or drink. In 802, according to Asser, Eadburh attempted to poison a young favourite of the king's but instead killed both of them. The young man may have been called Worr, as the Anglo-Saxon Chronicle records the death of both men shortly before the succession of Egbert, the grandfather of Alfred the Great, as king of Wessex.

== Exile ==
Eadburg subsequently fled to Francia and took refuge at the court of Charlemagne, where her husband's successor, Egbert of Wessex, had taken refuge after being exiled by Beorhtric. There, as Asser relates, Charlemagne was smitten by the former queen. Charlemagne brought in one of his sons and asked her which she preferred, him or his son, as a husband. She answered that, given the son's youth, she preferred the son. Charlemagne replied famously: "Had you chosen me, you would have had both of us. But, since you chose him, you shall have neither." He instead offered her a position as an abbess of a convent, which she accepted.

Soon thereafter, though, she was caught in a sexual affair with another Saxon man and, after being duly convicted, was expelled on the direct orders of Charlemagne, penniless, into the streets. In her last years, she lived as a beggar on the streets of Pavia.

== Aftermath and legacy ==
Two possibly authentic charters of 801 show Eadburh as regina (queen), a title that was rarely used for king's wives in Wessex in the ninth century. According to Asser, this was because of the shame that Eadburh had brought on the position. However, Offa and Beorhtric had driven Egbert into exile in the 780s, and the blackening of her name may also have been partly due to a desire to discredit Beorhtric.

Asser also writes that, as a result of the aristocracy's resentment of Eadburh, the status and influence of the subsequent queens was diminished and they were titled not 'queen' but 'king's wife'; the queen was also prohibited from sitting beside the king on the throne. This changed again when Charles the Bald insisted that his daughter Judith, who married King Æthelwulf, be properly crowned queen.
