= Battle of Bensington =

Major battle between Offa of Mercia and Cynewulf of Wessex

| Date | 779 |
| Location | Possibly the village of Benson in present-day Oxfordshire, England |
| Result | Mercian victory |

Belligerents
| Mercia | Wessex |

Commanders and leaders
| Offa of Mercia | Cynewulf of Wessex |

The Battle of Bensington was a major battle fought between Mercia, led by King Offa, and the West Saxons led by Cynewulf of Wessex. It ended with a victory for the Mercians.

== The battle and its consequences ==
Nearly nothing is known about the battle itself: the only evidence is a brief annal in the Anglo-Saxon Chronicle for 779 (777 in the manuscripts, whose dating is at this point dislocated by two years) reading: "Her Cynewulf & Offa gefuhton ymb Benesingtun & Offa nam þone tuun" ("This year Cynewulf and Offa fought near Bensington and Offa took the town").

Patrick Sims-Williams viewed the battle as being echoed in a territorial dispute between the Archbishop of Canterbury and the abbess of Cookham Abbey (named Cynethryth, probably the widow of Offa): Offa had taken the abbey and its lands, apparently by winning the Battle of Bensington, including land claimed not by the West-Saxon kings but by Christ Church, Canterbury. The dispute was resolved in 798 with the return of the abbey to Christ Church. The documents pertaining to this dispute imply that the Battle of Bensingon resulted in significant territorial gains for Mercia along its southern border: Sims-Williams thought that disputes attested later concerning Eynsham and Luton also arose from Mercian gains in 779.
