= Lady St Mary Church, Wareham =

Church in Dorset, England

Coordinates: 50.684313°N 2.107747°W

Lady St. Mary Church, Wareham
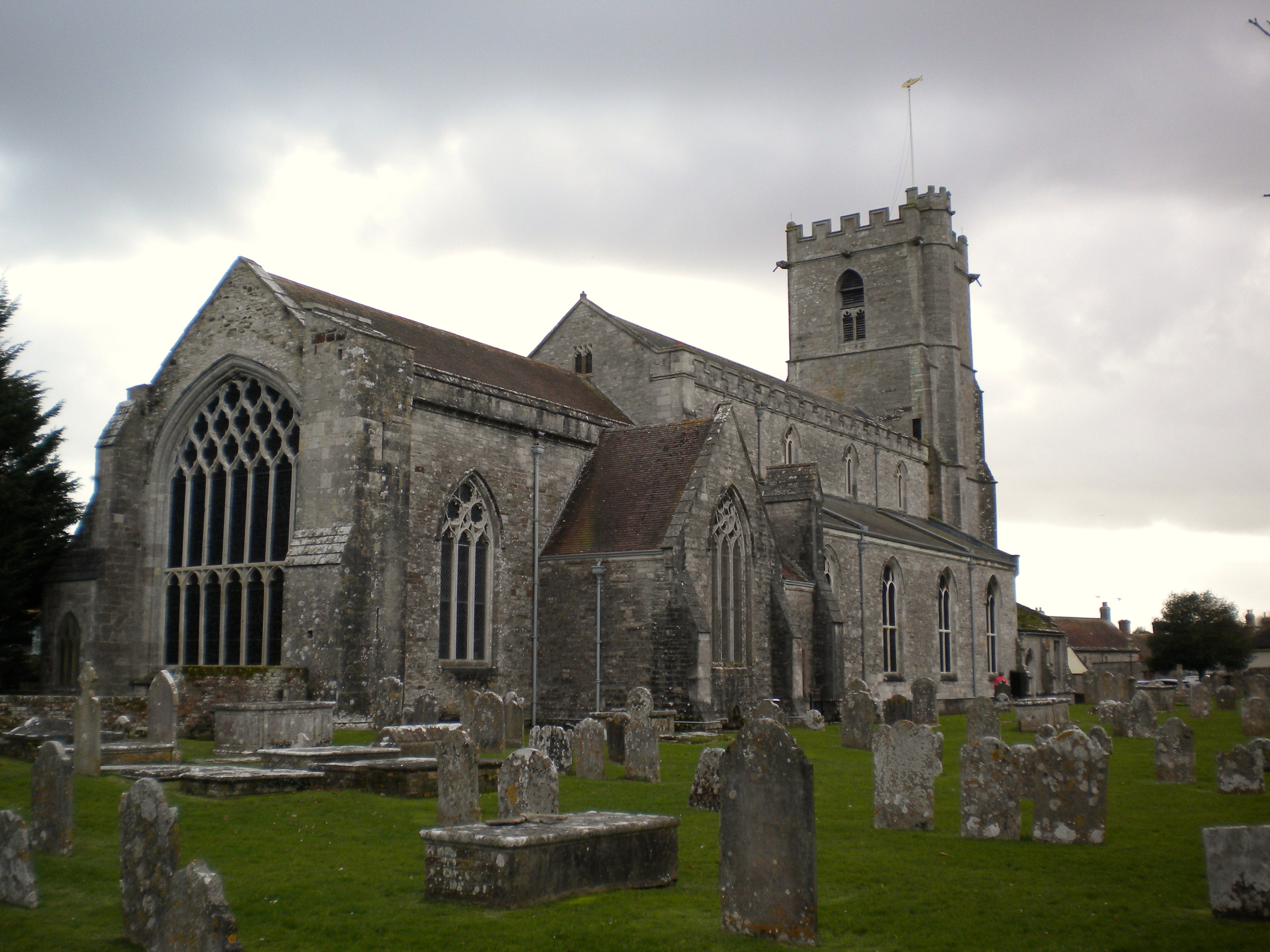
- Lady St. Mary Church, Wareham
- Country: England
- Denomination: Church of England

History
- Founded: circa 800
- Dedication: Saint Mary

Architecture
- Heritage designation: Grade I listed
- Designated: 7 May 1952
- Style: Norman, Gothic

Administration
- Diocese: Salisbury

The parish church of Lady St. Mary, Wareham is a church of Anglo-Saxon origin in the town of Wareham, Dorset, in England. The church is notable as the possible burial place of King Beorhtric, and for the discovery of five stones with Brittonic inscriptions dating to the 7th to 9th centuries. A notable feature is the unique hexagonal lead font dating to around 1200. The Anglo-Saxon nave was demolished in 1842.

== History ==
St Aldhelm, who was Bishop of Sherborne around 705, founded a church at Wareham which is probably the church of Lady St. Mary. A nunnery may have been associated with it, but this was destroyed by a Danish raid in 876, before being rebuilt by the daughter of Alfred the Great around 900. The church may also be where Beorhtric, King of Wessex, was buried in 802, and where the body of King Edward the Martyr was brought after he had been murdered at Corfe Castle in 978.

In April 2023, a criminal gang use explosives to steal a 450-year-old Elizabethan chalice worth £30,000 from a locked safe in the vestry of Lady St Mary Church.

== The church ==
On 7 May 1952 the church was officially designated as a Grade I listed building. The church is built of Purbeck limestone and has slate and tile roofs. It has a long chancel and a four-bay nave with two aisles. The south chapel is at a lower level than the rest of the building and at one time had a treasury above. The robust tower is at the west end of the church and is built in four stages, with diagonal buttressing to the lower three. There is a large transomed window at the west end and another at the east end that was installed by Clayton & Bell between 1886 and 1890. The church was founded in the 8th century, with the south chapel dating to the 12th century. Other parts of the building date to the 14th century and the tower probably to the early 16th century.

== Rectors ==
The first recorded rector of the church was Peter de Deserto (1302–08) who followed Prior Nicholas Bynet (c. 1296). In 1678 the rectory was annexed to that of Holy Trinity, Wareham, and the first rector of both parishes was John Jones.
