= Battle Edge =

Coordinates: 51.8082°N 1.6398°W

Battle-Edge is a former field, located beside Sheep Street and Tanners Lane, in Burford in Oxfordshire, England. It is traditionally associated with the battle recorded in the Anglo-Saxon Chronicle under the year 752, in which Cuthred, king of the West Saxons, fought Æthelbald, king of Mercia, at Burford and put him to flight.

== Chronicle and later accounts ==
The Anglo-Saxon Chronicle gives only a brief notice of the battle. In the edition edited by J. A. Giles, the entry states: "This year, the twelfth of his reign, Cuthred, king of the West-Saxons, fought at Burford with Æthelbald, king of the Mercians, and put him to flight." A note in James Ingram's edition gives variant forms of the place-name in later chroniclers, including Beorgforda, Beorhtforda, Bereford and Beorford.

Henry of Huntingdon gives a much fuller version of the battle. In his account, Cuthred rebelled because he could no longer endure Æthelbald's "insolent exactions and arrogance", and met him at Bereford with "bannered legions". Henry states that Æthelhun, reconciled with Cuthred after an earlier rebellion, led the West Saxons and carried the royal standard, a golden dragon. Henry's account presents the battle as decisive for the future subjection or liberty of Wessex and Mercia, and concludes that after Æthelbald's defeat the kingdom of Wessex was firmly established.

Robert Plot's 1677 Natural History of Oxford-shire describes Burford as a place of antiquity and says that the battle was fought near the town, "perhaps" at the place still called Battle Edge, west of Burford between the town and Upton. Plot states that Cuthred, described as a tributary king of the West Saxons, defeated Æthelbald of Mercia and won a banner on which a golden dragon was depicted. Plot also suggested that Burford's former custom of making a dragon each year and carrying it through the town on Midsummer Eve may have originated as a commemoration of the victory. He added that a giant was also included in the custom, though he did not know why.

In the 1722 English edition of William Camden's Britannia, Cuthred is described as a tributary king of the West Saxons who, unable to endure the "cruelty and intolerable Exactions" of Æthelbald, met him in battle, probably at Battle-edge west of the town.

== Sarcophagus discovery ==
Gardner's Directory of Oxfordshire, published in 1852, states that the field of the engagement was still known as Battle Edge, and reports the discovery of a stone sarcophagus near the site. It records:

As some workmen were making a road from Burford to Barrington, a few years since, they discovered a large stone sarcophagus of very rude workmanship, weighing nearly three tons, which on examination, was found to contain the remains of a human body, and portions of (apparently) a leathern cuirass studded with metal nails, completely oxidated and matted together. From the size and appearance of this coffin (which is still preserved in the church), and from the circumstance of its being found near to Battle Edge, it may be presumed it was deposited there after the battle between Æthelbald and Cuthred above noticed.

== Sources ==
- Camden, William (1722). Gibson, Edmund (ed.). Britannia: or a chorographical description of Great Britain and Ireland, together with the adjacent islands. Vol. 1 (2nd ed.). London – via Internet Archive.
- Giles, J. A., ed. (1914). The Anglo-Saxon Chronicle (PDF). London: G. Bell and Sons, Ltd. – via Internet Archive.
- History, Gazetteer, and Directory of the County of Oxford. United Kingdom: R. Gardner. 1852 – via Google Books.
- Henry of Huntingdon (1853). The Chronicle of Henry of Huntingdon. Translated by Forester, Thomas. London: Henry G. Bohn – via Internet Archive.
- Ingram, James (1912). The Anglo-Saxon Chronicle. Everyman's Library. London: J. M. Dent & Sons – via Internet Archive.
- Plot, Robert (1677). The Natural History of Oxford-shire: Being an Essay Toward the Natural History of England. Oxford: Printed at the Theater in Oxford – via Internet Archive.
