= Cynewulf of Wessex =

King of Wessex from 757 to 786

Cynewulf

King of Wessex
- Reign: 757–786
- Predecessor: Sigeberht
- Successor: Beorhtric
- Died: 786
- Burial: Winchester
- House: Wessex

Cynewulf was the King of Wessex from 757 until 786. Mercia, which was then the dominant power, went through a period of disorder during most of his reign, so he was able to keep his territory intact until he was defeated by King Offa of Mercia in 779. He was killed by the brother of his deposed predecessor in 786.

== Reign ==
Cynewulf became king after deposing his predecessor, Sigeberht, with the support of most of the magnates. He may have accepted the lordship of King Æthelbald of Mercia, whom he met shortly thereafter, but it is more likely that Æthelbald acknowledged his kingship. However, it was not long before Æthelbald was assassinated and as a consequence, Mercia fell into a brief period of disorder as rival claimants to its throne fought. Cynewulf was also often at war with the Cornish. He was a benefactor of the church but also seized lands claimed by religious houses.

In 779, Cynewulf was defeated by the new King of Mercia, Offa, at the Battle of Bensington, and Offa then retook Berkshire, and perhaps also London. Despite this defeat, there is no evidence to suggest Cynewulf subsequently became subject to Offa.

== Death ==
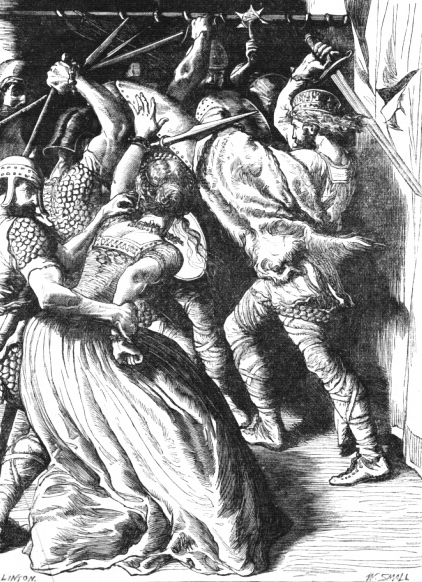
The murder of King Cynewulf of Wessex as depicted in Cassell's illustrated history of England.

In 786, Cynewulf attempted to expel Cyneheard, the brother of his predecessor, who discovered that Cynewulf was visiting his mistress's house in Meretun (Note: It is not known which of the many Mertons this refers to.) and launched an attack on him. Both Cynewulf and Cyneheard were killed in the ensuing fight. Cynewulf was buried at Winchester.

== Notes ==
Regnal titles
Preceded by Sigeberht	King of Wessex; 757–786	Succeeded by Beorhtric
