= Ismere Diploma =

736 Mercian charter

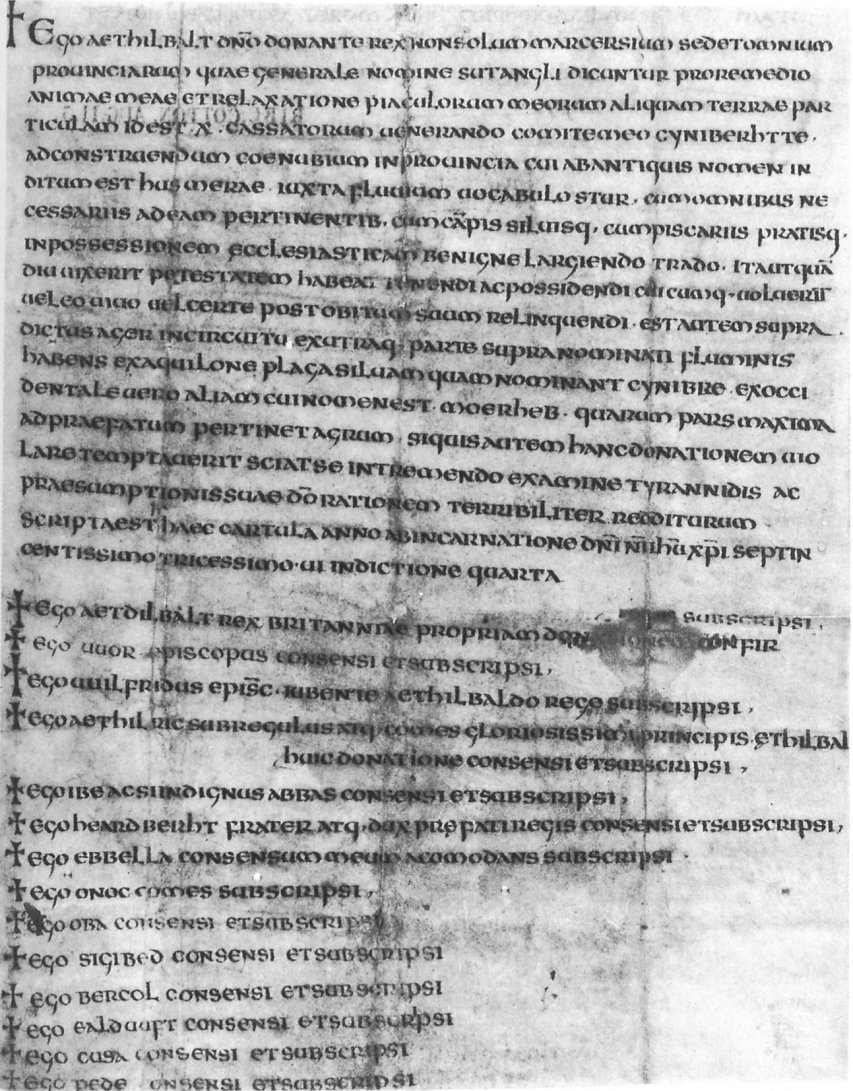
The Ismere diploma.

The Ismere Diploma (London, British Library, Cotton Augustus ii. 3) is a charter of 736, in which Æthelbald of Mercia grants ten hides of land near Ismere to Cyneberht, his "venerable companion", for the foundation of a coenubium (minster).

The charter survives in what is thought to be a contemporary manuscript, now in the British Library. It is written in Latin. The text is written in two different pens. The first pen is used for the charter itself, and also for the first two lines of the witnesses, and then the fourth through tenth lines of the witness list. The remaining lines are written with a thinner pen, though by the same hand that wrote the first lines written. A different scribe added another grant from Aethelbald to Cyneberht on the back. The addition of the later witnesses is an indication that the document is an original, and not a copy made later.

The charter concerns land on both sides of the River Stour with the wood of Cynibre (Kinver) on the north and the wood called Moerheb on the west. The traditional view has that the latter was to interpret Moerheb as Morfe, but this is a geographic impossibility. The wood is more likely to have become Kidderminster Heath.

The charter is the earliest mention of the Husmerae, a tribe only known from this area.
