= John Brompton =

Abbot of Jervaulx and supposed English chronicler

John Brompton or Bromton (fl. 1436) was a supposed English chronicler.

Brompton was elected abbot of Jervaulx in 1436. The authorship of the compilation printed in Roger Twysden's Decem Scriptores is uncertain. It has been ascribed to Brompton on the strength of an inscription at the end of the C. C. C. Cambridge MS., which may mean nothing more than that Brompton had that manuscript transcribed for him.

Thomas Duffus Hardy pointed out that the compilation must have been made after the middle of the fourteenth century, as it contains many extracts from Ralph Higden, who is referred to, 'and that there is reason to believe that it was based on a previous compilation, made probably by a person connected with the diocese of Norwich.' The work is wholly uncritical; widely accepted as authoritative by writers of past times, it contains many fables.
