= Ecgfrith =

Ecgfrith (Old English: Ecgfrið) was the name of several Anglo-Saxon kings in England, including:

- Ecgfrith of Northumbria (c. 645–685), King of Northumbria
- Ecgfrith of Mercia (died 796), King of Mercia
