= Ecgfrith of Mercia =

King of Mercia in 796

Ecgfrith
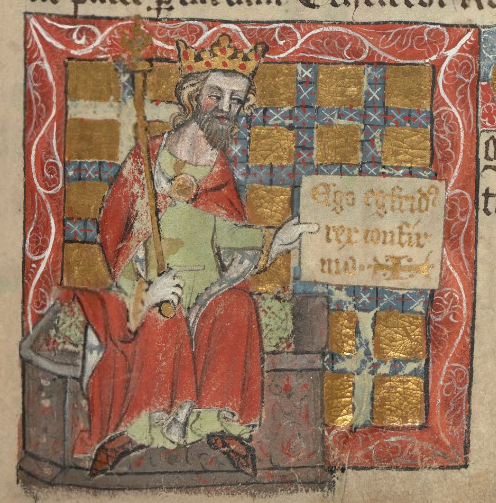
- Depiction of Ecgfrith appears in the late-medieval (14th-16th century) book of benefactors of St Albans Abbey

King of Mercia
- Reign: 29 July – December 796
- Predecessor: Offa
- Successor: Coenwulf
- Died: December 796
- House: Iclingas

Ecgfrith was king of Mercia from 29 July to December 796. He was the son of Offa, one of the most powerful kings of Mercia, and Cynethryth, his wife. In 787, Ecgfrith was consecrated king, the first known consecration of an English king, probably arranged by Offa in imitation of the consecration of Charlemagne's sons by the pope in 781. Around 789, Offa seems to have intended that Ecgfrith marry the Frankish king Charlemagne's daughter Bertha, but Charlemagne was outraged by the request and the proposal never went forward.

According to the Croyland Chronicle "he (Ecgfrith) was seized with a malady, and departed this life." His reign lasted 141 days.

Ecgfrith was succeeded by a distant relative, Coenwulf, presumably because Offa had arranged the murder of nearer relatives in order to eliminate dynastic rivals. According to a contemporary letter from Alcuin of York, an English deacon and scholar who spent over a decade at Charlemagne's court as one of his chief advisors:

That most noble young man has not died for his sins, but the vengeance for the blood shed by the father has reached the son. For you know how much blood his father shed to secure the kingdom upon his son.

Alcuin added: "This was not a strengthening of the kingdom, but its ruin."

== See also ==
- Kings of Mercia family tree

Titles of nobility
Preceded by Offa	King of Mercia; 796	Succeeded by Coenwulf
