= Æthelbald of Mercia =

King of Mercia from 716 to 757

Æthelbald
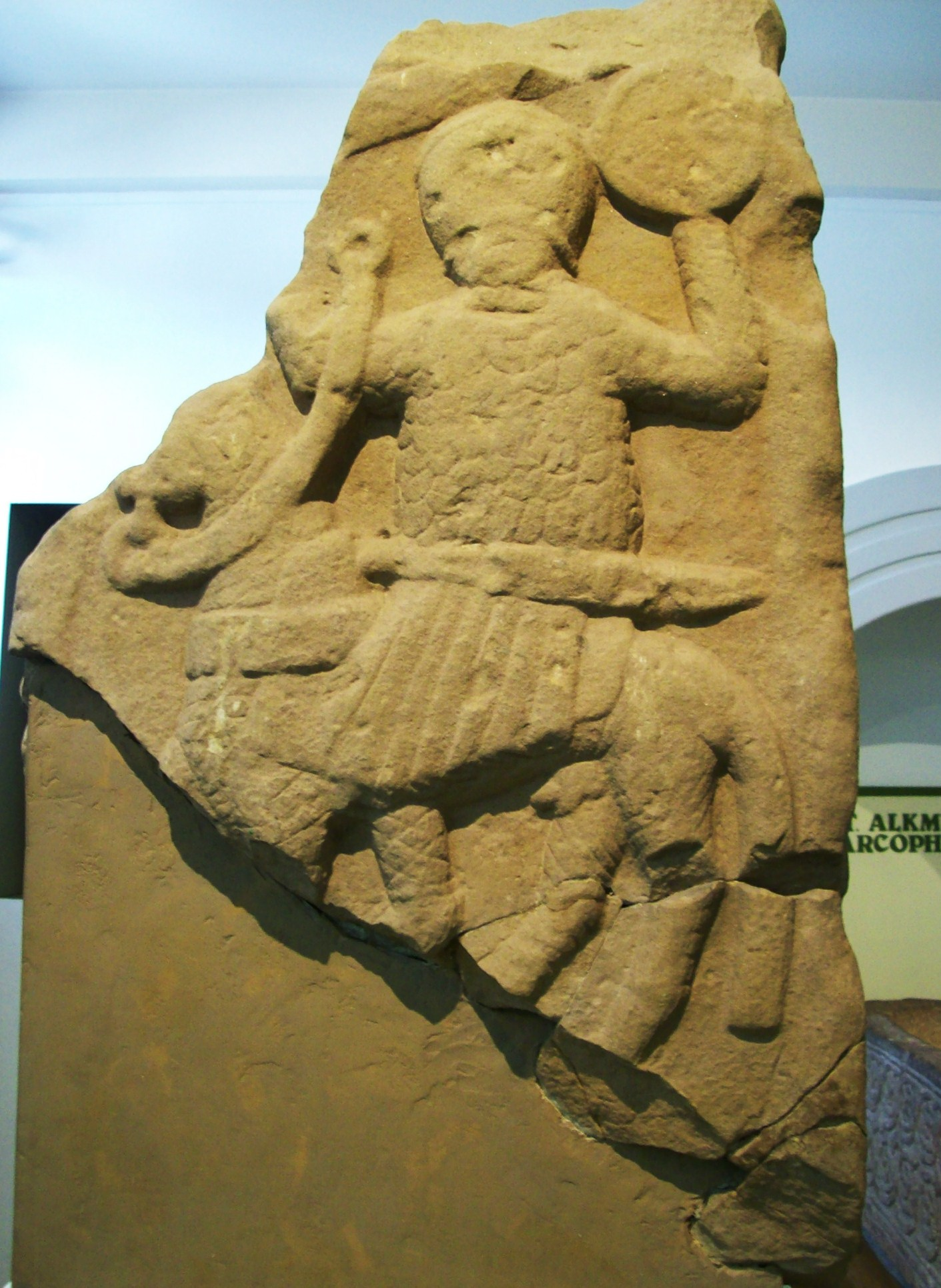
- The Repton Stone which may depict Æthelbald

King of Mercia
- Reign: 716–757
- Predecessor: Ceolred
- Successor: Beornred
- Died: 757; Seckington
- Burial: Repton
- House: Iclingas
- Father: Alweo

Æthelbald (also spelled Ethelbald or Aethelbald; died 757) was the King of Mercia, in what is now the English Midlands from 716 until he was killed in 757. Æthelbald was the son of Alweo and thus a grandson of King Eowa. Æthelbald came to the throne after the death of his cousin, King Ceolred, who had driven him into exile. During his long reign, Mercia became the dominant kingdom of the Anglo-Saxons, and recovered the position of pre-eminence it had enjoyed during the strong reigns of Mercian kings Penda and Wulfhere between about 628 and 675.

When Æthelbald came to the throne, both Wessex and Kent were ruled by stronger kings, but within fifteen years the contemporary chronicler Bede describes Æthelbald as ruling all England south of the Humber estuary. The Anglo-Saxon Chronicle does not list Æthelbald as a bretwalda, or "Ruler of Britain", though this may be due to the West Saxon origin of the Chronicle.

St. Boniface wrote to Æthelbald in about 745, reproving him for various dissolute and irreligious acts. The subsequent 747 council of Clovesho and a charter Æthelbald issued at Gumley in 749—which freed the church from some of its obligations—may have been responses to Boniface's letter. Æthelbald was killed in 757 by his bodyguards. He was succeeded briefly by Beornred, of whom little is known, but within a year, Offa, the grandson of Æthelbald's cousin Eanwulf, had seized the throne, possibly after a brief civil war. Under Offa, Mercia entered its most prosperous and influential period.

== Early life and accession ==
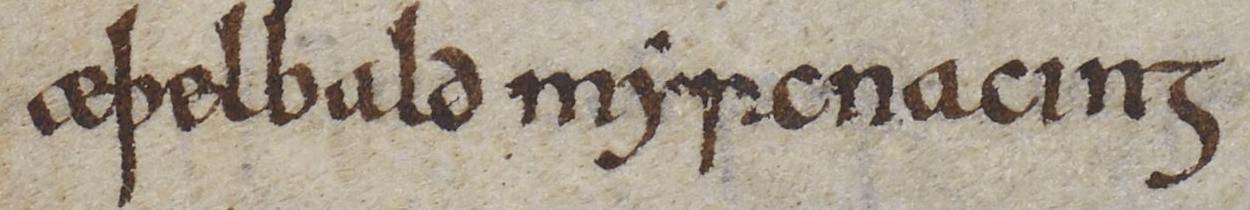
A mention of Æthelbald, the Mercian king, in the Anglo-Saxon Chronicle

Æthelbald came of the Mercian royal line, although his father, Alweo, was never king. Alweo's father was Eowa, who may have shared the throne for some time with his brother, Penda. The Anglo-Saxon Chronicle does not mention Eowa; though it does date Penda's reign as the thirty years from 626 to 656, when Penda was killed at the battle of the Winwaed. Two later sources also name Eowa as king: the Historia Brittonum and the Annales Cambriae. The Annales Cambriae is the source for Eowa's death in 644 at the battle of Maserfield, where Penda defeated Oswald of Northumbria. Details on Penda's reign are scarce, and it is a matter for speculation whether Eowa was an underking, owing allegiance to Penda, or if instead Eowa and Penda had divided Mercia between them. If they did divide the kingdom, it is likely that Eowa ruled northern Mercia, as Penda's son Peada was established later as the king of southern Mercia by the Northumbrian Oswiu, who defeated the Mercians and killed Penda in 656. It is possible that Eowa fought against Penda at Maserfield.

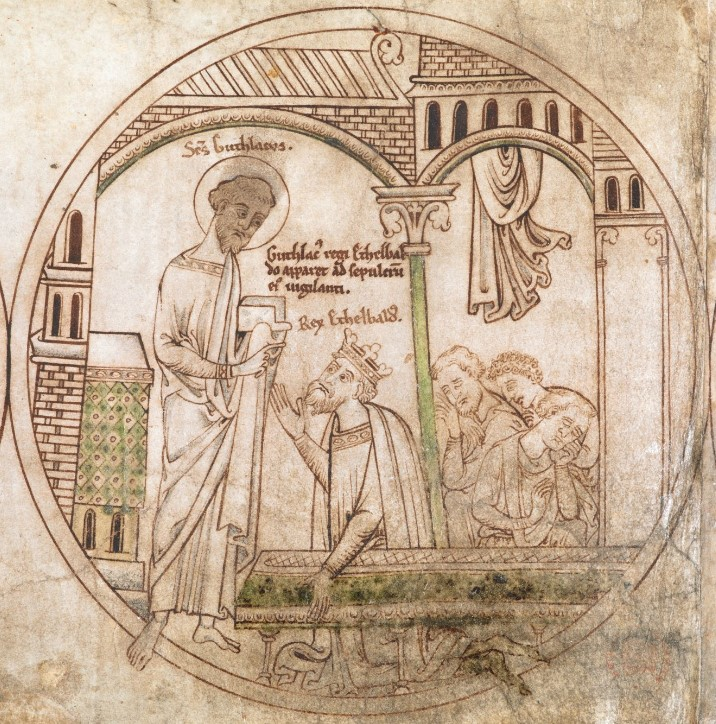
Guthlac appears to Æthelbald in a dream in this roundel from the Guthlac Roll (early 13th century).

During Æthelbald's youth, Penda's dynasty ruled Mercia; Ceolred, a grandson of Penda and therefore a second cousin of Æthelbald, was king of Mercia from 709 to 716. An early source, Felix's Life of Saint Guthlac, reveals that it was Ceolred who drove Æthelbald into exile. Guthlac was a Mercian nobleman who abandoned a career of violence to become first a monk at Repton Abbey, and later a hermit living in a barrow at Crowland, in the East Anglian fens. During Æthelbald's exile he and his men also took refuge in the Fens in the area, and visited Guthlac. Guthlac was sympathetic to Æthelbald's cause, perhaps because of Ceolred's oppression of the monasteries. Other visitors of Guthlac's included Bishop Haedde of Lichfield, an influential Mercian, and it may be that Guthlac's support was politically useful to Æthelbald in gaining the throne. After Guthlac's death, Æthelbald had a dream in which Guthlac prophesied greatness for him, and Æthelbald later rewarded Guthlac with a shrine when he had become king.

When Ceolred died of a fit at a banquet, Æthelbald returned to Mercia and became ruler. It is possible that a king named Ceolwald, perhaps a brother of Ceolred, reigned for a short while between Ceolred and Æthelbald. Æthelbald's accession ended Penda's line of descent; Æthelbald's reign was followed, after a brief interval, by that of Offa, another descendant of Eowa.

Other than his father, Alweo, little of Æthelbald's immediate family is known, although in the witness list of two charters a leading ealdorman named Heardberht is recorded as his brother.

== Mercian dominance ==
The kingdoms of Britain in the late seventh century, when Æthelbald was born.

Æthelbald's reign marked a resurgence of Mercian power, which would last until the end of the eighth century. With the exception of the short reign of Beornrad, who succeeded Æthelbald for less than a year, Mercia was ruled for eighty years by two of the most powerful Anglo-Saxon kings, Æthelbald and Offa. These long reigns were unusual at this early date; during the same period eleven kings reigned in Northumbria, many of whom died violent deaths.

By 731, Æthelbald had all the English south of the Humber under his overlordship. There is little direct evidence of the relationship between Æthelbald and the kings who were dependent on him. Generally, a king subject to an overlord such as Æthelbald would still be regarded as a king, but would have his independence curtailed in some respects. Charters are an important source of evidence for this relationship; these were documents which granted land to followers or to churchmen, and were witnessed by the kings who had power to grant the land. A charter granting land in the territory of one of the subject kings might record the names of the king as well as the overlord on the witness list appended to the grant; such a witness list can be seen on the Ismere Diploma, for example. The titles given to the kings on these charters could also be revealing: a king might be described as a "subregulus", or underking.

Enough information survives to suggest the progress of Æthelbald's influence over two of the southern kingdoms, Wessex and Kent. At the start of Æthelbald's reign, both Kent and Wessex were ruled by strong kings; Wihtred and Ine, respectively. Wihtred of Kent died in 725, and Ine of Wessex, one of the most formidable rulers of his day, abdicated in 726 to go on a pilgrimage to Rome. According to the Anglo-Saxon Chronicle, Ine's successor, Aethelheard, fought that year with an ealdorman named Oswald, whom the Chronicle provides with a genealogy showing descent from Ceawlin, an early king of Wessex. Aethelheard ultimately succeeded in this struggle for the throne, and there are subsequent indications that he ruled subject to Mercian authority. Hence it may be that Æthelbald helped establish both Aethelheard and his brother, Cuthred, who succeeded Aethelheard in 739. There is also evidence of South Saxon territory breaking away from West Saxon dominance in the early 720s, and this may indicate Æthelbald's increasing influence in the area, though it could have been Kentish, rather than Mercian, influence that was weakening West Saxon control.

As for Kent, there is evidence from Kentish charters that shows that Æthelbald was a patron of Kentish churches. There is no charter evidence showing Æthelbald's consent to Kentish land grants, and charters of Aethelberht and Eadberht, both kings of Kent, survive in which they grant land without Æthelbald's consent. It may be that charters showing Æthelbald's overlordship simply do not survive, but the result is that there is no direct evidence of the extent of Æthelbald's influence in Kent.

Less is known about events in Essex, but it was at about this time that London became attached to the kingdom of Mercia rather than that of Essex. Three of Æthelbald's predecessors—Æthelred, Coenred, and Ceolred—had each confirmed an East Saxon charter granting Twickenham to Waldhere, the bishop of London. From Kentish charters it is known that Æthelbald was in control of London, and from Æthelbald's time on, the transition to Mercian control appears to be complete; an early charter of Offa's, granting land near Harrow, does not even include the king of Essex on the witness list. For the South Saxons, there is very little charter evidence, but as with Kent, what there is does not show any requirement for Æthelbald's consent to land grants. The lack of evidence should not obscure the fact that Bede, who was after all a contemporary chronicler, summarized the situation of England in 731 by listing the bishops in office in southern England, and adding that "all these provinces, together with the others south of the Humber and their kings, are subject to Æthelbald, King of the Mercians."

There is evidence that Æthelbald had to go to war to maintain his overlordship. In 733 Æthelbald undertook an expedition against Wessex and captured the royal manor of Somerton. The Anglo-Saxon Chronicle also tells how when Cuthred succeeded Aethelheard to the throne of Wessex, in 740, he "boldly made war against Aethelbald, king of Mercia". Three years later, Cuthred and Æthelbald are described as fighting against the Welsh. This could have been an obligation placed on Cuthred by Mercia; earlier kings had similarly assisted Penda and Wulfhere, two strong seventh-century Mercian rulers. In 752, Æthelbald and Cuthred are again on opposite sides of the conflict, and according to one version of the manuscript, Cuthred "put him [Æthelbald] to flight" at Burford. Æthelbald seems to have reasserted his authority over the West Saxons by the time of his death, since a later West Saxon king, Cynewulf, is recorded as witnessing a charter of Æthelbald at the very beginning of his reign, in 757.

In 740, a war between the Picts and the Northumbrians is reported. Æthelbald, who might have been allied with Óengus, the king of the Picts, took advantage of Eadberht's absence from Northumbria to ravage his lands, and perhaps burn York.

== Titles and Bretwaldaship ==
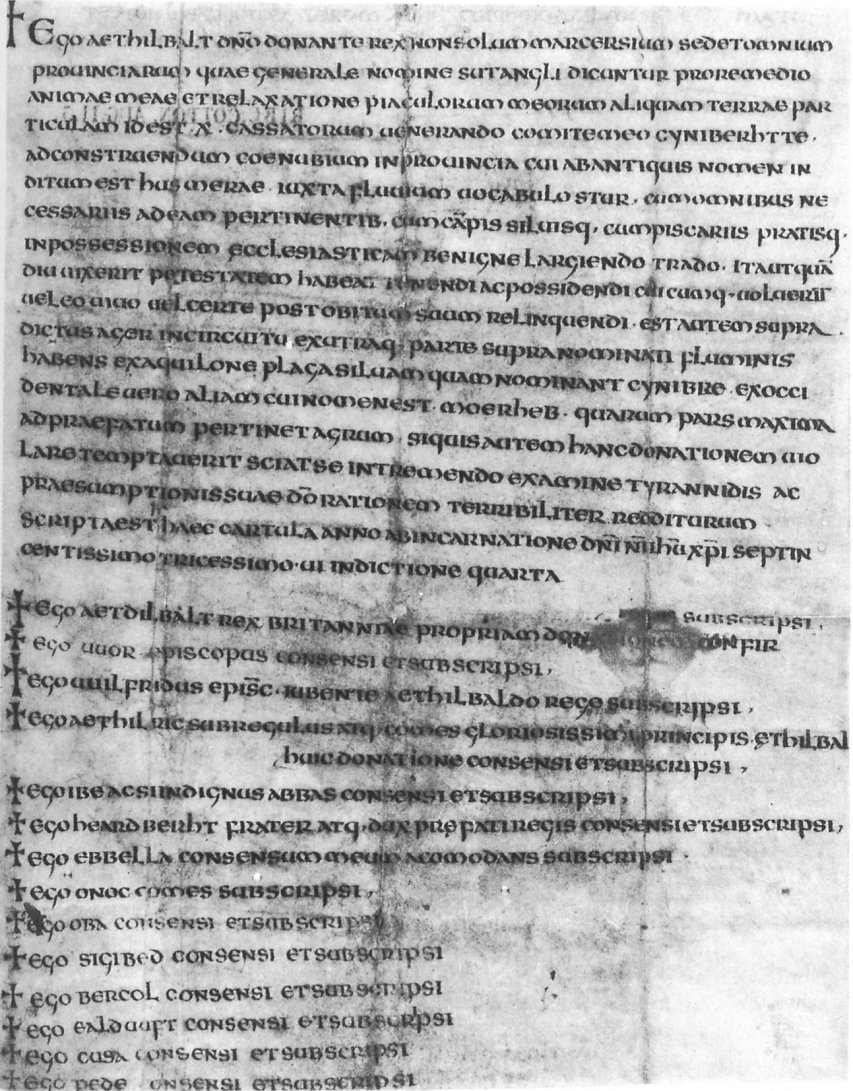
The Ismere Diploma, a charter of King Æthelbald's to Ealdorman Cyneberht in 736.

Earlier in Bede's Ecclesiastical History of the English People, he lists seven kings who governed the southern provinces of the English, with reigns dating from the late fifth to the late seventh century. Subsequently, the Anglo-Saxon Chronicle—another important source for the period—describes these seven as bretwaldas or brytenwaldas, a title translated as "Britain-ruler" or "Wide-ruler". The Chronicle adds just one king to the list: Egbert of Wessex, who reigned in the ninth century. The resulting list of eight bretwaldas omits several strong Mercian kings. It is possible that the chronicler was merely adding Egbert's name to Bede's original list of seven, rather than claiming that no other kings achieved similar powers in England. The chronicler was almost certainly a West Saxon, and since neither Æthelbald nor Offa were kings of Wessex it is possible the chronicler does not mention them out of regional pride. The meaning of the term "bretwalda", and the nature of the power that these eight kings wielded, has had much academic scrutiny. One suggested interpretation is that since Bede was writing during Æthelbald's reign, the original seven he listed were essentially those kings who could be seen as prototypes of Æthelbald in their domination of England south of the Humber.

Further evidence of Æthelbald's power, or at least his titles, is provided by an important charter of 736, the Ismere Diploma, which survives in a contemporary (and possibly original) copy. It starts by describing Æthelbald as "king not only of the Mercians but also of all the provinces which are called by the general name South English"; in the witness list he is further named "Rex Britanniae", "King of Britain". One historian described this title as "a phrase which can only be interpreted as a Latin rendering of the English title Bretwalda"; but it may be that at that time these titles would not have been acknowledged much beyond Worcester, where this and other documents from the 730s that use similar titles were written.

== Relations with the church ==
In 745–746, the leading Anglo-Saxon missionary in Germany, Boniface, along with seven other bishops, sent Æthelbald a scorching letter reproaching him for many sins—stealing ecclesiastical revenue, violating church privileges, imposing forced labour on the clergy, and fornicating with nuns. The letter implored Æthelbald to take a wife and abandon the sin of lust:

We therefore, beloved son, beseech Your Grace by Christ the son of God and by His coming and by His kingdom, that if it is true that you are continuing in this vice you will amend your life by penitence, purify yourself, and bear in mind how vile a thing it is through lust to change the image of God created in you into the image and likeness of a vicious demon. Remember that you were made king and ruler over many not by your own merits but by the abounding grace of God, and now you are making yourself by your own lust the slave of an evil spirit.

Boniface first sent the letter to Ecgberht, the archbishop of York, asking him to correct any inaccuracies and reinforce whatever was right; and he requested Herefrith, a priest whom Æthelbald had listened to in the past, to read and explain it to the king in person. Though Boniface's letter praises Æthelbald's faith and alms-giving, its criticisms have strongly coloured subsequent opinion of Æthelbald. A claim made in a ninth-century list of donations from the abbey of Gloucester that Æthelbald had "stabbed—or smitten" to death the kinsman of a Mercian abbess has also contributed negatively to his reputation.

Æthelbald may have influenced the appointment of successive archbishops of Canterbury in Tatwine, Nothelm, and Cuthbert, the last probably the former bishop of Hereford; and despite Boniface's strong criticisms, there is evidence of Æthelbald's positive interest in church affairs. A subsequent letter of Boniface's to Cuthbert, Archbishop of Canterbury, provided a good deal of information about Frankish synods, especially one held in 747, the decrees of which Boniface included in the letter. Boniface does not explicitly suggest to Cuthbert that he, too, should hold a synod, but it seems clear that this was Boniface's intent. A council was, in fact, subsequently held at Clovesho (the location of which is now lost); Æthelbald attended and perhaps presided. The council was concerned with the relationship between the church and the secular world, and it condemned many excesses on the part of the clergy. The council limited relations between monks and laymen and ruled that secular activities were impermissible for monks: secular business and secular songs were both forbidden, especially "ludicrous songs".

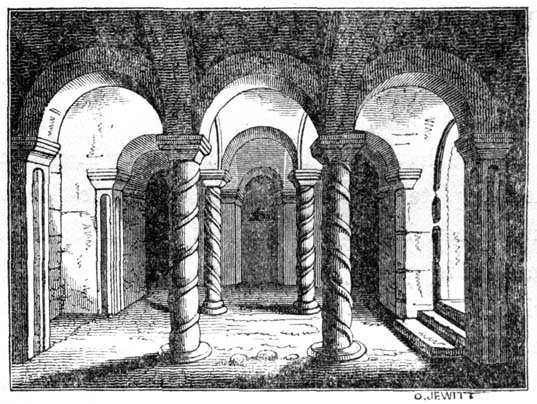
A 19th-century engraving of the crypt at St Wystan's Church, Repton where Æthelbald was interred

Two years after this, in 749, at the synod of Gumley, Æthelbald issued a charter that freed ecclesiastical lands from all obligations except the requirement to build forts and bridges—obligations which lay upon everyone, as part of the trinoda necessitas. This charter was witnessed only by Mercian bishops, and it is possible it had no effect outside Mercia, but it is also possible that it was essentially part of a reform programme inspired by Boniface and instigated at Clovesho.

== Death ==
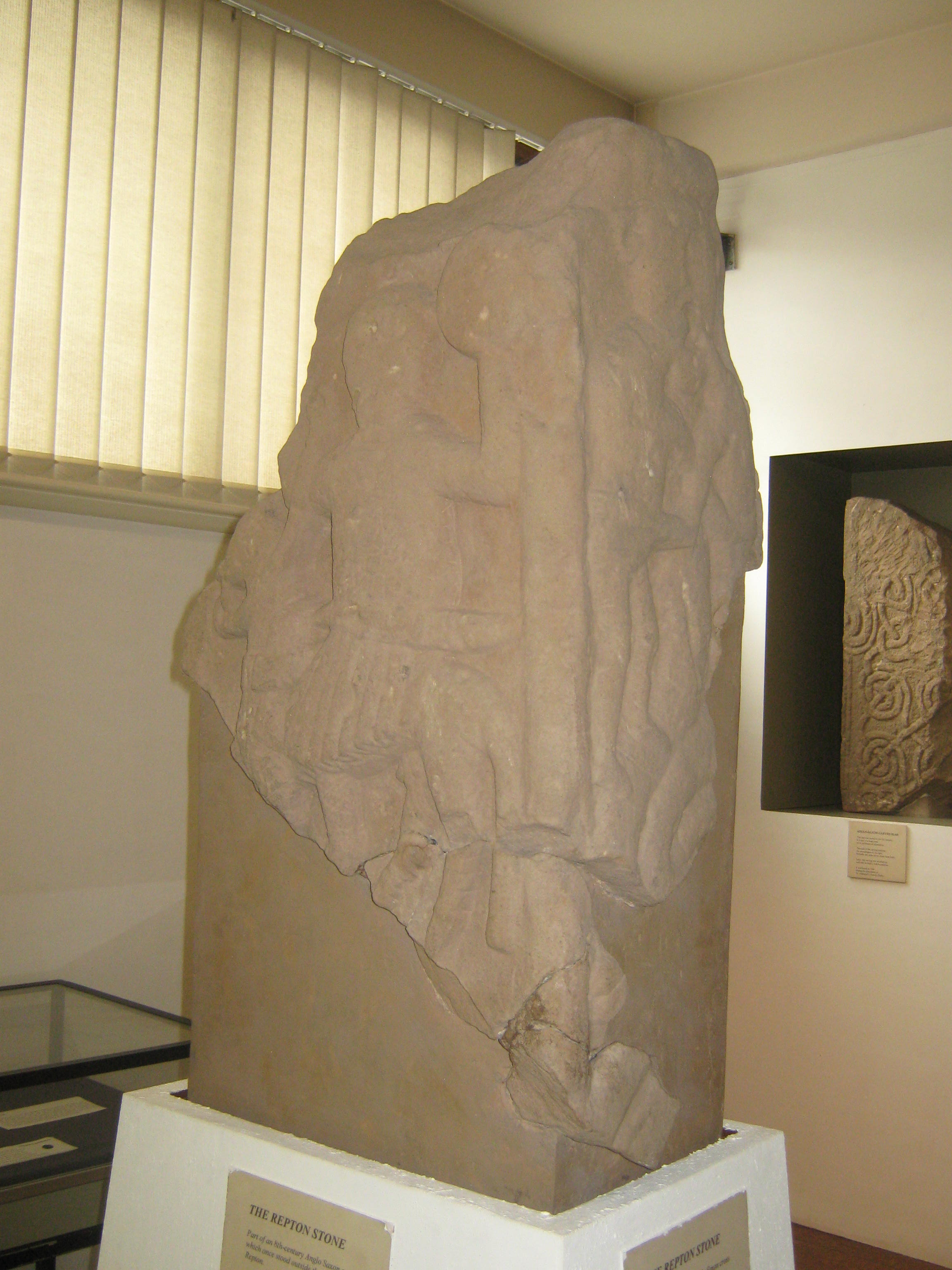
The mounted figure on the Repton Stone in Derby Museum has been identified as Æthelbald.

In 757, Æthelbald was killed at Seckington, Warwickshire, near the royal seat of Tamworth. According to a later continuation of Bede's Ecclesiastical History, he was "treacherously murdered at night by his own bodyguards", though the reason is unrecorded. He was succeeded, briefly, by Beornrad. Æthelbald was buried at St Wystan's Church, Repton, in a crypt which still can be seen; a contemporary is reported to have seen a vision of him in hell, reinforcing the impression of a king not universally well-regarded. The monastery church on the site at that time was probably constructed by Æthelbald to house the royal mausoleum; other burials there include that of Wigstan.

A fragment of a cross shaft from Repton includes on one face a carved image of a mounted man which, it has been suggested, may be a memorial to Æthelbald. The figure is of a man wearing mail armour and brandishing a sword and shield, with a diadem bound around his head. If this is Æthelbald, it would make it the earliest large-scale pictorial representation of an English monarch.

== Legend of Alfred III, King of Mercia ==
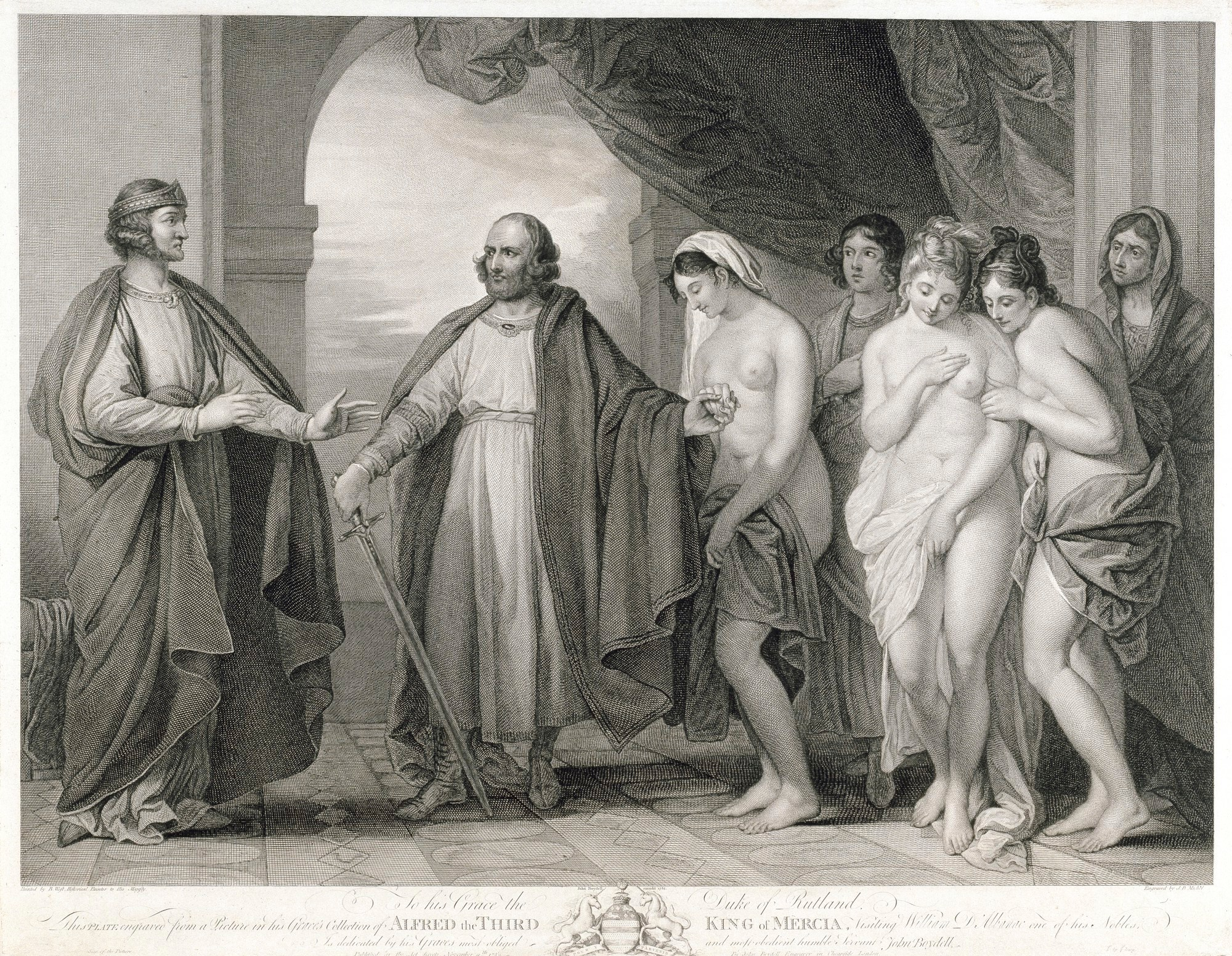
Alfred the Third, King of Mercia, visiting William d'Albanac, engraving after Benjamin West's painting (1782)

According to a story recorded by the 16th-century antiquarian John Leland, and derived by him from a now lost book in the possession of the Earls of Rutland at Belvoir Castle, there was once a King Alfred III of Mercia, who reigned in the 730s. Though no Mercian king was ever named Alfred, let alone three, if this story has any historical basis (which Leland himself rejected) it must presumably relate to Æthelbald. The legend states that Alfred III had occasion to visit a certain William de Albanac, alleged ancestor of the Earls of Rutland, at his castle near Grantham, and took a fancy to William's three comely daughters. It was the king's intention to take one as his mistress, but William threatened to kill whichever he chose rather than have her dishonoured in this way, whereupon Alfred "answerid that he meant to take one of them to wife, and chose Etheldrede that had fat bottoks, and of her he had Alurede that wan first all the Saxons the monarchy of England." A painting of this supposed incident was commissioned in 1778 by the Duke of Rutland, but was destroyed in a fire in 1816.

== See also ==
- Kings of Mercia family tree

== Notes ==
Titles of nobility
Preceded by Ceolred	King of Mercia; 716–757	Succeeded by Beornred
