= Foremark =

Hamlet in Derbyshire, England

Coordinates: 52.836°N 1.507°W

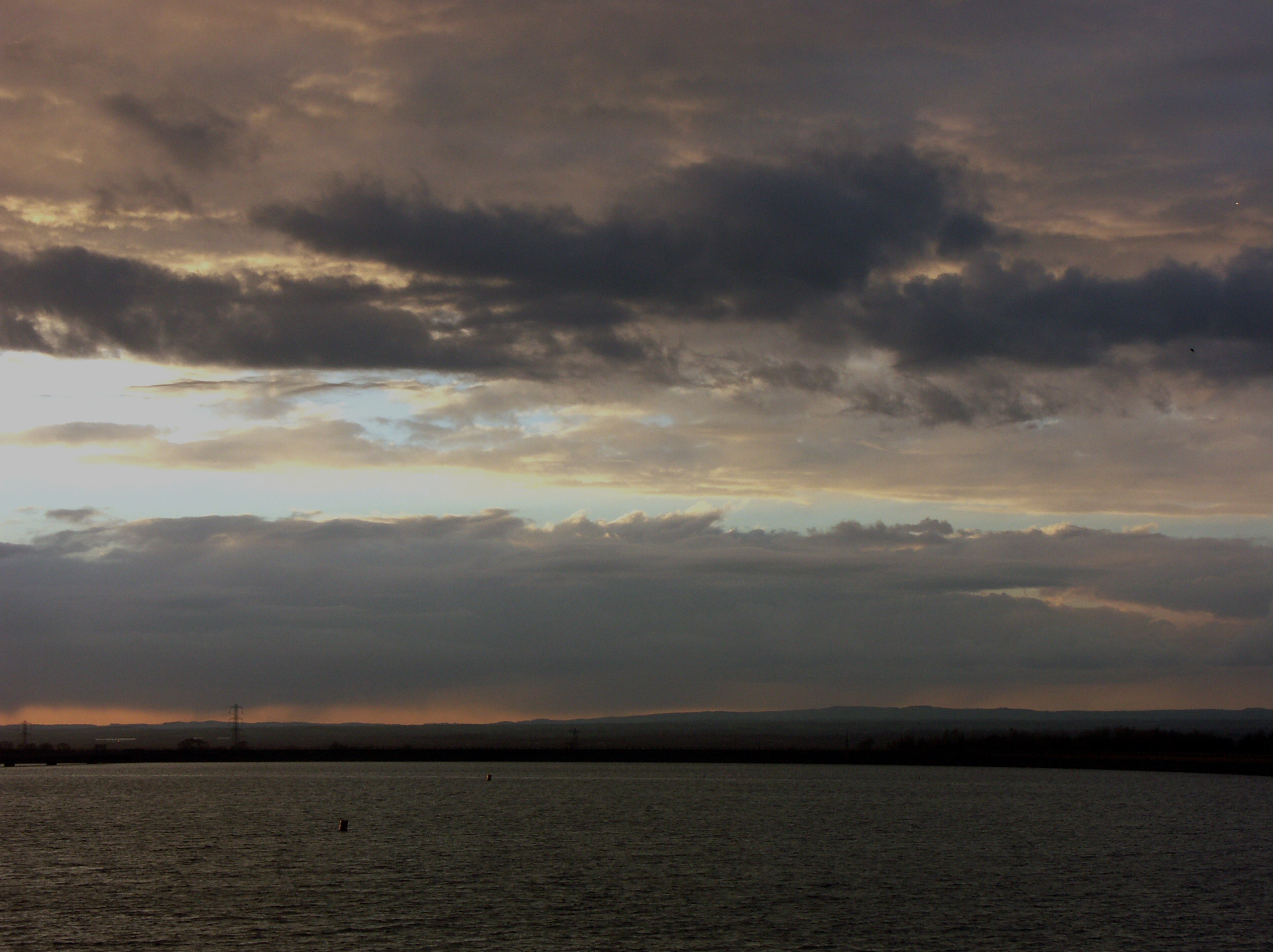
- The most notable features are the nearby reservoir (above) and the school

- Location within Derbyshire
- OS grid reference: SK333266
- District: South Derbyshire
- Shire county: Derbyshire
- Region: East Midlands
- Country: England
- Sovereign state: United Kingdom
- Post town: DERBY
- Postcode district: DE65
- Police: Derbyshire
- Fire: Derbyshire
- Ambulance: East Midlands

Foremark is a hamlet and civil parish in the South Derbyshire district of Derbyshire, England. It contains Foremarke Hall, a medieval manor house which now houses Repton Preparatory School; and part of Foremark Reservoir.

Foremark is near the hamlets of Ingleby, Ticknall, Milton and the village of Repton. Its postal address is Milton. It is also a few miles to the east of the town of Burton upon Trent.

== History ==
The toponym is of Old Norse origin, from forn "old" and verk "fortification". Following discoveries by a local metal detectorist, excavations in 2018 found indications of a Viking camp at Foremark, possibly associated with the winter camp of the Great Heathen Army in 874 at nearby Repton.

Foremark is mentioned in 1086 in the Domesday Book. The book says under the title of “The lands of Nigel of Stafford":

”In Foremark Ulfkil had two carucates of land to the geld. There is land for 2 ploughs. There is now one plough in demesne and 5 villans and 3 bordars have one plough. There is one mill rendering 2 shillings and 24 acres (97,000 m^{2}) of meadow, woodland pasture half a league long and as much broad. TRE worth 40 shillings now 15 shillings.“

Foremake was the manor given to the Burdett Family of Bramcote since the family became a hereditary line of baronets. The Burdett family yielded several politicians, The most notable Burdett lords were Sir Robert Burdett, Francis Burdett and Sir Francis Burdett. The manor house, Foremarke Hall, was built by the orders of one of the baronets in the family in 1762 and now sits in the centre of Foremark.

Foremark saw a more active role in World War I when Foremarke Hall was used as an army military hospital; and World War II, when the hall was an officer training centre.

The fields around were a Starfish site (one of several decoy sites used to distract German bombers en route to bomb Derby).

== Parish church ==
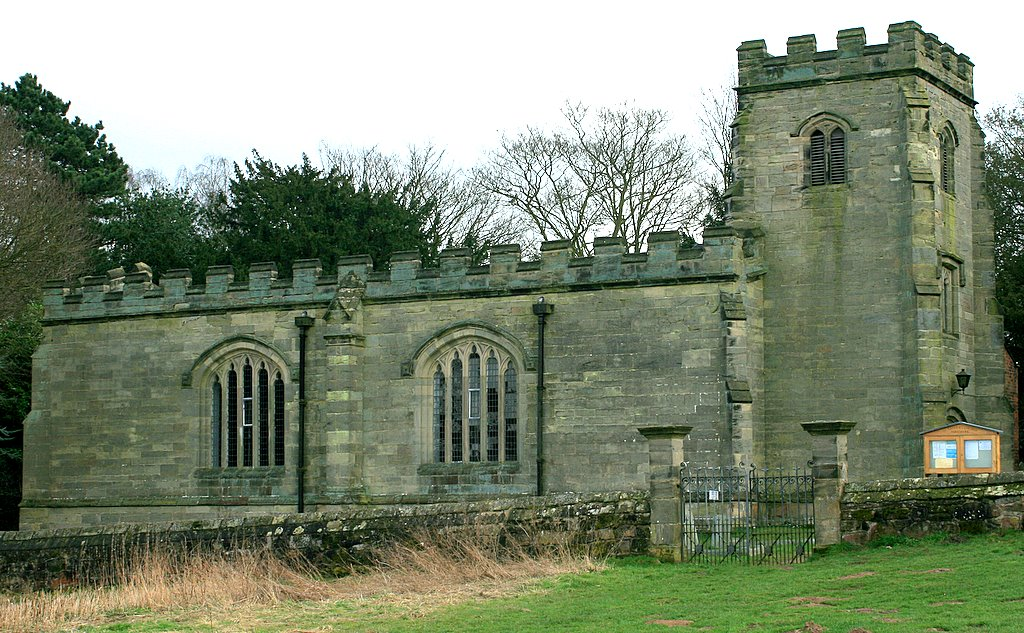
Saint Saviour's church

The parish church of Saint Saviour is on a small mount in south-western Foremark. It was built in 1662 by Sir Francis Burdett, and retains most of its original furnishings. It is a Grade I listed building.

== See also ==
- Listed buildings in Foremark
