= Guarin (surname) =

Guarin or Guarín is a surname. Notable people with the surname include:

- Christopher Guarin (c. 1970 – 2012), Filipino journalist
- Fredy Guarín (born 1986), Colombian footballer
- Hugh Patrick Guarin Maule (1873–1940), British architect
- Percy Guarin (born ?), former Filipino footballer

== See also ==
- Guarin, Italian chaplain and chancellor
