= Anchor Church =

Caves in Derbyshire, England

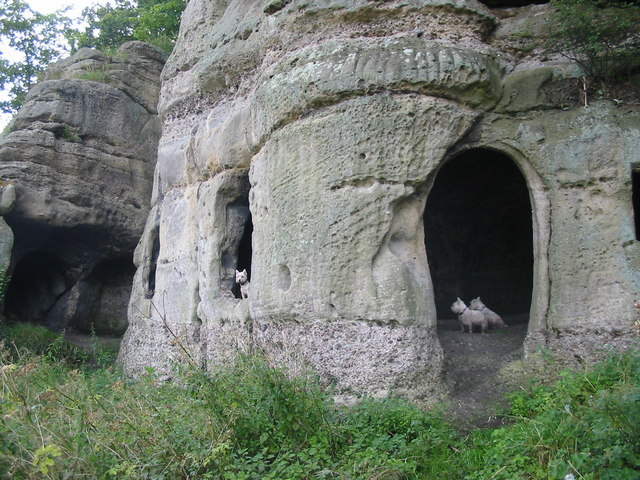
- Anchor Church near Ingleby

- Location within Derbyshire
- Location: Ingleby, Derbyshire, England
- Coordinates: 52°50′30″N 1°29′51″W
- Geology: Keuper sandstone

Listed Building – Grade II
- Official name: Anchor Church
- Designated: 9 January 1967
- Reference no.: 1096534

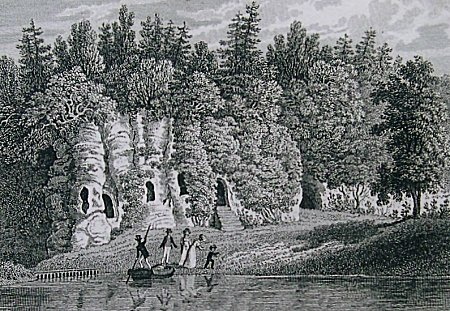
Ingleby Anchor Church, from an engraving dated 1823

Anchor Church is a series of caves in a Keuper Sandstone (Triassic conglomerate) outcrop, close to the village of Ingleby, Derbyshire, England. The caves have been extended by human intervention to form a crude dwelling place, complete with door and window holes.

The sandstone outcrop once formed part of the banks of the River Trent and the caves were formed by the action of the river on the rock. The course of the river has altered and left the caves opening onto a backwater pool. It has been designated as both a Regionally Important Geological Site, and as a Local Wildlife Site.

== History ==
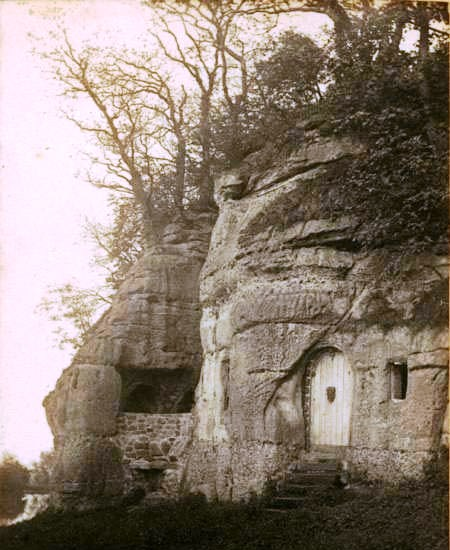
The caves in 1895 showing the fitted door

The name Anchor Church is derived from the term anchorite (from the Greek ἀναχωρέω anachōreō, "to withdraw" or "to depart into the countryside") because it is thought to have been the cell of an Anchorite hermit, St Hardulph, who lived and prayed here in the 8th and 9th century. Research by the Royal Agricultural University and Wessex Archaeology published in 2021 supported the association with Hardulph (also known as Eardwulf of Northumbria, a deposed king of Northumbria who died in AD830). The nearby church at Breedon on the Hill is dedicated to this saint. In the Middle Ages, the caves were used by a monk named Bernard, who died here whilst doing penance for his involvement in some unknown crime. Records of the caves exist from 1658 when it is mentioned in Repton church records.

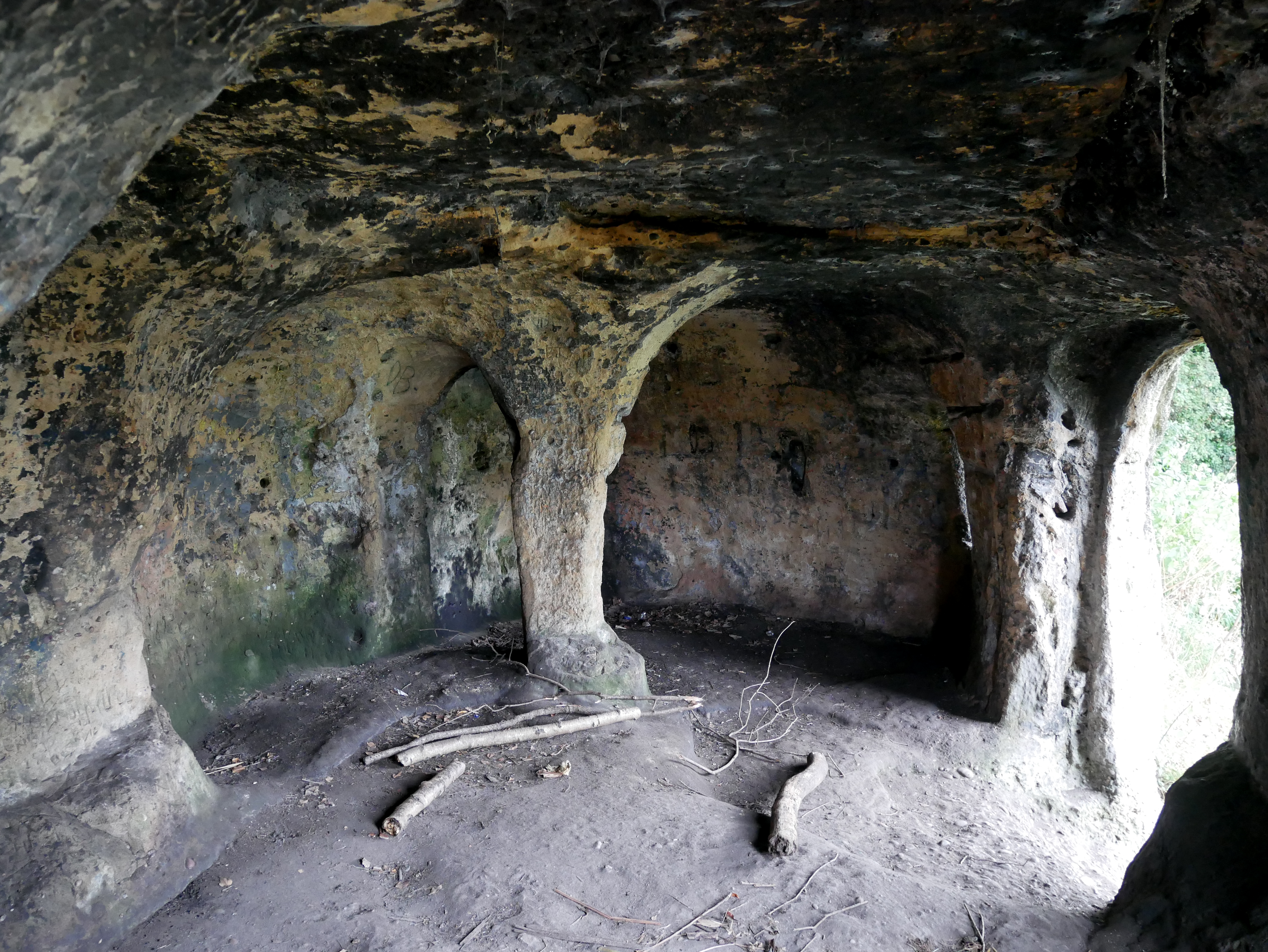
The westernmost of the three main rooms inside the structure

William Woolley, writing around 1715, said: "About half a mile eastward (from Foremark Hall), upon the side of the Trent, is a large cave dug out of a rock in the form of a chapel, called Anker church. It has been, as tradition informs us, an anchorite’s cell and it really is a most solitary, pleasant place." D. P. Davies, in 1811, described the caves: "Several excavations, or cells, which communicate with each other and give a probability to the tradition of its having been the residence of an anchorite; whence it has derived the name of Anchor Church."

The cave featured in a painting by Thomas Smith of Derby in 1745.

The Burdett family of Foremarke Hall enlarged the caves to the present size in the 18th century, fitting a door in 1845 and some additional brickwork, including a set of steps to the main entrance. Sir Francis Burdett used the caves as a summerhouse and held picnics there. Forming part of the romantic landscape of Formarke Hall and its park in the 18th century, Anchor Church was an important destination for its owners and their guests, allowing them to walk and admire views out over the Trent valley.

The caves are nowadays on the route of several popular walks in the area. Anchor Church is a Grade II listed building.

In 2015, a large area of the valley over which Anchor Church has a commanding view was subject to a planning application for gravel extraction. It formed part of a 61 hectare extension to Swarkestone Quarry by Tarmac Aggregates Limited.

== Natural history ==
Anchor Church is included on the list of Derbyshire Regionally Important Geological Sites (RIGS), and is also listed as a Local Wildlife Site. Species of note found here include wall pennywort (Umbilicus rupestris) which grows on the rocks themselves, plus shining pondweed (Potamogeton lucens), a very rare "Red Data List" plant in Derbyshire, found in the backwater channel below the rocks and two other sites elsewhere in the county. Other species of note recorded near Anchor Church include Eurasian otter, and 1970s records of small water-pepper (Persicaria minor).

== See also ==
- Listed buildings in Foremark
