= Listed buildings in Repton =

Repton is a civil parish in the South Derbyshire district of Derbyshire, England. The parish contains 53 listed buildings that are recorded in the National Heritage List for England. Of these, six are listed at Grade I, the highest of the three grades, one is at Grade II*, the middle grade, and the others are at Grade II, the lowest grade. The parish contains the village of Repton, the smaller village of Milton, and the surrounding area. The major complex of buildings is associated with Repton School, built on the site of an earlier priory. Many of these are listed, four of them at Grade I. The other Grade I listed buildings are St Wystan's Church and the market cross. Most of the other listed buildings are houses, cottages and associated structures, the earlier ones timber framed, and the later ones in red brick. The rest of the listed buildings include farmhouses and farm buildings, bridges, a water management system, a war memorial, and a telephone, kiosk.

== Key ==
Grade	Criteria
I	Buildings of exceptional interest, sometimes considered to be internationally important
II*	Particularly important buildings of more than special interest
II	Buildings of national importance and special interest

== Buildings ==
Name and location	Photograph	Date	Notes	Grade
St Wystan's Church; 52.84121°N 1.55157°W		9th century	Parts of the eastern end of the church are Anglo-Saxon, since which time the church has been considerably extended and altered, and it was restored in 1885–86 by Arthur Blomfield. The church is built in sandstone with roofs of tile and lead, and consists of a nave with a clerestory, north and south aisles, a south porch, a chancel, and a west steeple. The steeple has a tower with three unequal stages, angle buttresses and moulded string courses. On the west side is a doorway with a moulded surround and a hood mould, above which is a three-light Perpendicular window with an embattled transom and a hood mould, and a lancet window with a trefoil head, and on the south front is a clock face. The top stage contains two-light bell openings, a quatrefoil frieze, and an embattled parapet with corner pinnacles. The tower is surmounted by a recessed octagonal spire with three tiers of lucarnes. The porch is gabled and has two storeys, and along the nave is an embattled parapet.	I
The Old Priory, walls and gate piers, Repton School; 52.84133°N 1.55103°W		Late 12th century	Originally Repton Priory, the building was converted into a school in 1557. It is in sandstone with some red brick, a chamfered string course, and a tile roof with moulded coped gables, plain kneelers and finials. There are two storeys and attics, and a west front of seven bays, the outer bays gabled. In the ground floor are a segmental archway, doorways, one with a chamfered surround, and windows, some of which are cross windows, some are mullioned and transomed, and others are casements. The upper floor contains similar windows, and in the roof are seven gabled dormers. Attached to the west by a low wall are the Pillars of Hercules, which consist of square piers with moulded cornices and ball finials. The east front has ten bays, the middle three bays with two gables, and an open arcade with basket arches and an impost band.	I
Priory Gateway, walls, barn and lodge, Repton School; 52.84071°N 1.55091°W		13th century	The gateway consists of a sandstone triple-chamfered pointed arch with a hood mould. It has two orders of nook shafts, two chamfers to each side, and moulded capitals. On the south side are massive buttresses. The walls enclose part of the precincts of the school, and are in sandstone with chamfered copings. They contain a four-centred arched doorway, and a blocked pointed arch containing an inscribed plaque. Attached to the wall is a barn of probable medieval origin, it is timber framed with brick nogging on the east front, and has a tile roof and five internal bays. To the northeast of the archway is a lodge built in 1896. It is in Tudor style with a single storey, and has a tile roof with coped gables, an embattled parapet, and a polygonal turret bay with transomed windows.	I
Remains of the Priory Church and the Chapter Block, Repton School; 52.84137°N 1.55042°W	—	13th century	The remains of the priory church, cloisters and associated buildings consist of the footings of the buildings, a narrow chamfered arch, and the bases of columns, piers and doorways. The chapter block was built in about 1886, it is in sandstone and in Tudor style. It has sill bands, and a tile roof with coped gables, moulded kneelers and finials. There are two storeys and two unequal gabled bays. The block contains a large doorway with a moulded surround, and mullioned and transomed windows.	I
Lychgate and churchyard wall, St Wystan's Church; 52.84070°N 1.55125°W		Medieval	Parts of the walls enclosing the churchyard are medieval, and parts date from the 19th century. They are in sandstone with chamfered copings. At the entrance to the churchyard is a lychgate dating from about 1905, with a chamfered stone base, timber superstructure and a tile roof. The sides have two bays with a balustrade. The roof is gabled with moulded bressummers and carved bargeboards. The walls have square piers with Gothic panels and pyramidal caps.	II
Market cross 52.83982°N 1.55054°W		Medieval	The market cross is in sandstone and has a polygonal plan. It is surrounded by eight steps, and has a two-tiered octagonal base, each tier with a chamfered top. On this is a 17th-century circular shaft with entasis and a plain capital, and it is surmounted by a ball finial.	I
Repton Hall with Prior Overton's Tower, Repton School; 52.84199°N 1.55113°W	—	c. 1438	Originally the prior's lodgings, later converted into a house and then used as a school, most of the building dates from about 1680, with an extension in the 19h century. It is built in sandstone and red brick, with a floor band, a moulded cornice, and a tile roof. There are three storeys, a 17th-century block of nine bays, and a later extension of four bays to the east. The doorway has a moulded architrave and a segmental pediment. The windows in the main block are cross windows with sashes, moulded surrounds and keystones, and in the extension they are sashes with plain lintels. The top floor is tile hung, and contains eight gabled dormers. At the rear is Prior Overton's Tower in ornate brickwork. It consists of two buttresses rising to corbelled polygonal turrets with slit windows. Between them are two giant blank cusped two-light arches in two tiers, with two tiers of cross windows, and a corbelled moulded parapet.	I
Stone House; 52.83829°N 1.54877°W		Late 16th century	The house, which was later altered, is in sandstone, and has a tile roof with coped gables and moulded kneelers. There are two storeys, the gable end faces the road, and contains a 19th-century shop front over which is a sash window with a moulded surround. Behind are three bays containing a mix of sash and casement windows.	II
The Tudor Lodge and garden wall 52.83820°N 1.54866°W		Late 16th century	A timber framed house on a sandstone plinth with a tile roof. There are two storeys and a symmetrical front of three bays. In the centre bay is a projecting gabled two-story porch, the upper storey slightly jettied. The porch has a four-centred arch and balustrades sides, and the doorway has a four-centred arch. In the outer bays are four-light casement windows, and in front of the garden is a brick wall, slightly ramped and with rounded copings.	II
Ruin of Stable, Repton Park; 52.82150°N 1.53582°W	—	Early 17th century	The ruins of the stable are in sandstone and red brick, partly rendered, and have a rectangular plan. There is a single storey, three bays, and side wings. In the centre is a round-arched doorway with a moulded surround, panelled spandrels, a keystone, and a moulded hood mould, and it is flanked by buttresses. The outer bays contain single-light windows with moulded surrounds and hood moulds.	II
10 Burton Road; 52.83897°N 1.55170°W		17th century	The cottage, which has been altered, is partly timber framed with brick nogging, partly in red brick, and partly in sandstone, and it has a thatched roof. There is a single storey and an attic, and a front of two bays. On the east gable end is exposed timber framing on a sandstone plinth, and there are casement windows. The south front is in brick on a rendered plinth, and it contains sash windows, and the west front is pebbledashed and contains a doorway.	II
The Farmhouse, walls and railings 52.83534°N 1.52581°W	—	17th century	The farmhouse, which was later extensively rebuilt, is in red brick with a dentilled eaves cornice, and a tile roof with coped gables and plain kneelers. There are two storeys, a main block of three bays, and projecting single-bay wings with hipped roofs. There is a central doorway and sash windows, all with brick wedge lintels, the windows in the upper floor of the main block with segmental heads. In front of the main block is a low sandstone wall with iron railings.	II
1 Willington Road; 52.84047°N 1.55168°W		Late 17th century	Three cottages combined into a house, it is timber framed with brick nogging, rendered on the front, and has a thatched roof. There is a single storey and attics, and five bays. On the front is a doorway to the left, and five two-light casement windows. In the attic are four casement windows with triangular heads in gabled dormers.	II
Brook End House; 52.84094°N 1.54721°W	—	Late 17th century	A red brick house with a sawtooth eaves cornice, and a tile roof with coped gables and plain kneelers. There are two storeys and three bays. The central doorway has a rectangular fanlight, the windows are sashes, and all the openings have wedge lintels.	II
Gate piers, Repton School; 52.84174°N 1.55119°W	—	Late 17th century	The gate piers are in sandstone and have a square plan. On the piers are pilasters, moulded on the south and plain on the north. At the top are moulded cruciform caps and ball finials. The piers are flanked by coped walls, to the north is a semicircular flight of six steps, and the gates are in wrought iron, dating from the 19th century.	II
The Highways; 52.83784°N 1.54868°W		Late 17th century	A timber framed house with brick nogging, later extended in brick, with a tile roof, two storeys and attics. The doorway has a moulded surround, the windows are casements, and there are three gabled dormers. The north gable end is weatherboarded.	II
The Thatched House; 52.84046°N 1.55188°W		Late 17th century	A pair of cottages combined into one house, it is timber framed with brick nogging and painted brick, and has a thatched roof. There is a single storey and attics, and three bays. The right bay is in brick and contains two segmental-headed windows. The other windows are casements, and above are three eyebrow dormers.	II
The Grange; 52.83469°N 1.54577°W	—	1703	A red brick house with painted stone dressings, floor bands, a moulded eaves cornice, and a tile roof with coped gables and plain kneelers. There are three storeys and a symmetrical front of five bays. Six steps with curved parapet walls lead up to the central doorway that has an architrave and a pediment on consoles. The windows are sashes with brick wedge lintels and stepped keystones.	II*
Entrance gate, 16 Main Street; 52.83483°N 1.54541°W	—	Early 18th century	The single gate at the entrance to the garden is in wrought iron. It has pilasters with decorative panels and urn finials, buttressed to the rear, and with an iron bar linking the top.	II
1 High Street; 52.83981°N 1.55026°W		18th century	A house and a shop in red brick with a dentilled eaves cornice and a tile roof. There are two storeys and a front of three bays, the right bay lower. In the ground floor are two 19th-century shop fronts, the upper floor contains three sash windows with segmental arches, and in the roof of the left bay is a gabled dormer.	II
11 The Cross; 52.84025°N 1.55108°W	—	18th century	The house, which was altered in 1908–09 by Forsyth and Maule in Arts and Crafts style, is in red brick, pebbledashed on the front, with a hood mould band, and a polychromatic hipped tile roof with overhanging eaves. There are two storeys, and an L-shaped plan, consisting of a front range of three bays, the middle bay projecting and gabled, and a rear wing. In the centre is a round-headed arch with impost blocks and voussoirs, and a recessed porch. The windows are casements, those in the rear wing with segmental heads.	II
Dovecote, Brook Farm; 52.83526°N 1.52551°W	—	Mid 18th century	The dovecote is in red brick with a dentilled eaves cornice, and a tile roof with a wooden cupola and a weathervane. There are two storeys and a rectangular plan. On the front is a segmental-headed doorway and a cart entrance with a timber lintel, and above is a three-light window with a segmental head. The left return contains a round-arched window, and in the right return is a segmental-headed window in each floor.	II
Common Farmhouse; 52.83470°N 1.52562°W	—	Mid 18th century	The farmhouse is in red brick on a stone plinth, with a dentilled eaves cornice, and a tile roof with coped gables and plain kneelers. There are three storeys and a symmetrical front of three bays. The central doorway has a rectangular fanlight, the windows in the lower two floors are sashes, in the top floor they are casements, and all the openings have brick wedge lintels.	II
Danesgate; 52.83520°N 1.54805°W	—	Mid 18th century	A house in cottage orné style, in painted brick, with a tile roof at the front, and a hipped Welsh slate roof at the rear. There are two storeys, a front with a main block of three bays, the middle bay gabled, and a recessed two-bay wing on the right. In the centre is a gabled porch with decorative bargeboards, and a doorway with a chamfered surround and a four-centred arched head, flanked by canted bay windows, over which is a lean-to roof with decorative valancing. In the upper floor is a central cross window, and the outer bays contain three-light windows with moulded mullions and lights with round-arched heads. Across the gable is a carved frieze, and to the west of the house is a conservatory with oriel windows.	II
Mill Farmhouse; 52.83465°N 1.52280°W		Mid 18th century	The farmhouse is in red brick with a dentilled eaves cornice, and a tile roof with one coped gable and kneelers. There are two storeys, two ranges, and a west front of three bays. The taller range to the right has sash windows with brick wedge lintels, and the lower range has casement windows and a segmental-headed doorway.	II
Brook Farmhouse; 52.83513°N 1.52546°W	—	1766	The farmhouse is in red brick with floor bands, a dentilled eaves cornice and a tile roof. There are two storeys, a double range plan, and three bays. The central doorway has a rectangular fanlight, the windows are sashes, and all the openings have segmental heads. The date is engraved on a brick.	II
46 High Street; 52.83707°N 1.54818°W		Late 18th century	The house is rendered and has a brick dentilled eaves cornice and a tile roof. There are two storeys and a symmetrical front of three bays. The central doorway has pilasters, a traceried fanlight, and a hood mould on consoles. It is flanked by canted bay windows, and the upper floor contains sash windows.	II
Brook Lynn; 52.84074°N 1.54742°W	—	Late 18th century	A red brick house with a dentilled eaves cornice and a tile roof. There are three storeys and two bays. The central doorway has a dentilled cornice, and there is a smaller round-arched passage doorway to the left. The windows are sashes with brick wedge lintels.	II
Hazeldine; 52.83725°N 1.54779°W		Late 18th century	A house in red brick with a dentilled eaves cornice and a tile roof. There are two storeys and a symmetrical front of three bays. In the centre is a porch, and a doorway with pilasters, a traceried fanlight, and moulded brackets, and above it is a sash window with a brick wedge lintel. The outer bays contain two-storey canted bay windows with hipped roofs in Welsh slate.	II
Post Office; 52.83969°N 1.55011°W		Late 18th century	A house incorporating a post office, it is in red brick on a chamfered plinth, with a dentilled eaves cornice, a blocking course and a tile roof. There are three storeys and three bays. The middle bay has a giant blind recessed arch containing a Tuscan Doric doorway with a traceried fanlight and an open pediment. In the right bay is a 20th-century shop front. The windows are sashes, the window above the doorway with a moulded architrave, and the top window has a keystone. The other windows have channelled wedge lintels and keystones, and in front of the window in the ground floor of the left bay are bowed cast iron railings.	II
Loscoe Farmhouse; 52.81883°N 1.53167°W		1781	The farmhouse is in red brick on a chamfered plinth, with a dentilled eaves cornice and a tile roof. There are three storeys, three bays, and a two-storey lean-to. In the centre of the east front is a doorway with a pediment, and on the west front is an open gabled porch on two columns. Most of the windows are casements with brick wedge lintels, and in the middle of the west top floor is a circular window.	II
Dovecote, Ridgeway Farm; 52.83115°N 1.53692°W		c. 1800	The dovecote and cart shed are in red brick with a dentilled eaves course, and a tile roof with coped gables and plain kneelers. There are two storeys, with the cart shed below and the dovecote above, and a roughly square plan. On the roof is a cupola with arched openings, two tiers of perches, a moulded cornice and a pyramidal roof, surmounted by a decorative metal weathervane.	II
The Croft, office and gate piers 52.84001°N 1.55093°W		c. 1800	The main block is in stone with a floor band, a moulded cornice, a blocking course, and a Welsh slate roof. There are two storeys, the ground floor rusticated, and seven bays, with four bays projecting. In the second bay is a Tuscan Doric porch with a triglyph frieze. The windows are sash windows, those in the upper floor of the projecting bays with moulded architraves. To the left is a brick wing with a dentilled eaves cornice, and two bays. In the ground floor are two sash windows, and above is a casement window. At the rear is a wing with a Venetian window with a Diocletian window above, and a Trafalgar porch. Attached to the left are rusticated gate piers.	II
Homelands; 52.83645°N 1.54743°W		1818	A red brick house on a plinth, with a dentilled eaves cornice and a tile roof. There are two storeys and a symmetrical front of three bays. Steps with railings lead up to a central Tuscan Doric doorway with a triglyph frieze, and a rectangular fanlight with geometric glazing. The windows are sashes with brick wedge lintels.	II
27–29 High Street; 52.83840°N 1.54894°W		Early 19th century	A pair of cottages in rendered and painted brick on a chamfered plinth, with overhanging bracketed eaves and a Welsh slate roof. There are two storeys and five bays. On the front are two doorways with Trafalgar canopies, and horizontally-sliding sash windows, those in the ground floor with segmental-arched heads, and with flat heads in the upper floor.	II
3 and 5 The Cross; 52.84012°N 1.55100°W		Early 19th century	A house and a former bank in red brick with a sawtooth eaves cornice and a tile roof. There are three storeys and three bays. On the right is a shop front including a doorway with fluted pilasters and a rectangular fanlight, flanked by curved shop windows with a fluted frieze. To its left is a doorway with a fanlight and a wedge lintel. Further to the left, and in the middle floor, are sash windows with wedge lintels, and the top floor contains sash windows, one horizontally sliding.	II
Kirby Holt, walls, piers and railings 52.83516°N 1.52582°W	—	Early 19th century	The house is in rendered brick with angle pilasters, a moulded cornice, and a hipped Welsh slate roof. There are two storeys and a symmetrical front of three bays. In the centre is a Tuscan Doric porch with a moulded cornice, and a doorway with a rectangular fanlight, and the windows are sashes. The front garden is enclosed on the sides by a stone and brick wall and rusticated angle piers with pyramidal caps, and at the front is a low wall with iron railings and a central gate.	II
Lawn Bridge; 52.82363°N 1.53733°W		Early 19th century	The bridge carries Robin's Cross Lane over Repton Brook. It is in sandstone, and consists of two segmental arches. The bridge has voussoirs, small triangular cutwaters with half-pyramid tops, a band, curving parapets with chamfered copings, and small end piers.	II
Ridgeway Farmhouse; 52.83181°N 1.53692°W		Early 19th century	The farmhouse is in red brick with a dentilled eaves cornice and a tile roof, hipped to the south. There are three storeys, a symmetrical range of three bays, and a lower bay added to the left. The central doorway has a bracketed hood mould. The windows in the lower two floors are sashes with wedge lintels, those in the ground floor tripartite, and in the top floor and in the lower bay they are casements.	II
St Wystan's; 52.83811°N 1.54889°W		Early 19th century	A house in red brick, partly rendered, with sill bands, a moulded cornice, and a tile roof. There are three storeys and four bays. The main doorway has a shallow hood on consoles, and to the left is a smaller doorway with a moulded architrave. The windows are sashes in moulded architraves, in the top floor is an oval traceried window in a rectangular moulded architrave, and at the rear is a tall staircase window.	II
The Hayes; 52.81988°N 1.54371°W		Early 19th century	A small country house, it is rendered, and has a tile roof with overhanging eaves, decorative bargeboards, and two storeys. The east front has three gabled bays, the middle gable half-hipped. In the centre is a porch with two circular embattled angle turrets, the merlons corbelled out, and plain parapets. The porch has a broad four-centred arch and a doorway flanked by buttresses. The windows are sashes with stepped pointed segmental-arched heads. The south front has two gables and three bays, and on the right is a conservatory with French doors containing a Gothic doorway. To the west are two ranges in painted brick with a dentilled cornice and mostly segmental-headed windows.	II
Weir and water management system 52.82290°N 1.53726°W		Early 19th century	The water management system consists of three weirs, spillways, and a stone three-arched sluice bridge. At the western side is a semicircular sluice outfall in stone with a carved and dated lintel.	II
100–106 High Street; 52.83562°N 1.54637°W		c. 1830	Two pairs of cottages in cottage orné style, in red brick with a Welsh slate roof. Each pair has a gable with fretted bargeboards and a finial, and in the centre is a gabled porch with fretted bargeboards, a broad four-centred arch and two doorways, each with a four-centred arched head and a chamfered surround. The windows are casements with segmental heads and decorative glazing bars.	II
Willington Bridge; 52.84800°N 1.56146°W		1836	The bridge carries Willington Road (B5008 road), over the River Trent. It is in stone, and consists of five segmental arches with hood moulds. The bridge has small rounded cutwaters, pilaster strips, a dentilled cornice, a coped parapet, and end piers with round-arched openings.	II
United Reformed Church; 52.83571°N 1.54512°W		1837	The church is in red brick on a tall rendered plinth, with a dentilled eaves cornice, and a hipped tile roof. On the north front are three round-headed windows, higher to the left is a small similar window, and lower is a round-headed doorway with a fanlight. On the west front is a single-storey porch, and at the east end are two round-arched windows.	II
The Chapel, Repton School; 52.84022°N 1.55334°W		1858–59	The chapel was designed by H. I. Stevens in Perpendicular style, and there have been later additions. It is built in sandstone with Welsh slate roofs, and consists of a nave, north and south aisles, a south porch, north and south transepts, an ante-chapel, and a chancel with a polygonal apse. Towards the east end of the nave is a lead spire with an octagonal bell stage and crocketed gables.	II
Pears School, Repton School; 52.84112°N 1.55061°W		1883–86	A memorial hall and classrooms designed by Arthur Blomfield in Tudor style, the building is in sandstone, and has a tile roof with moulded coped gables, plain kneelers, finials, and embattled parapets. There are two storeys and five bays, with polygonal embattled turrets on the corners. The second and fourth bays of the south front are gabled, and the fifth bay projects. The windows have mullions or transoms, or both. On the gabled west front are balustraded steps leading up to three doorways, over which is a canted oriel window with moulding beneath.	II
Easton House; 52.83552°N 1.55100°W	—	1907	The house designed by Edwin Lutyens is in red brick with brick quoins, floor bands, and hipped tile roofs. There are two storeys and an irregular L-shaped plan. The south front has seven bays, the outer two bays projecting on each side. The front contains cross windows in the ground floor with segmental-arched heads, in the upper floor are casement windows with flat heads, and elsewhere are dormers. To the north are single-storey service rooms and outbuildings around a courtyard, and to the west is a round-arched gateway with a wrought iron gate.	II
Engine House, Easton House; 52.83598°N 1.55126°W	—	1907	A folly or garden ornament designed by Edwin Lutyens, it is in red brick with a hipped tile roof and has a single storey. The north front has a projecting centre, containing double doors with a seven-light window above, and flanked by wings with sloping roofs. Each of the east and west fronts has a dormer with a hipped roof and casement windows, and in the south front is a bay window with a chamfered band, and a circular window in a square recessed panel.	II
Gymnasium and gates, Repton School; 52.84107°N 1.55408°W	—	1907	The gymnasium, designed by Forsyth and Maule, is in red brick with a half-hipped tile roof. There is a single storey and basement, and sides of nine bays, between which are buttresses. The south front has four buttresses, a round-arched doorway with a Diocletian window above, and cross windows. On the sides are cross windows, and in the roof are four hip roofed dormers. Along the road is a low wall containing four rusticated brick piers with moulded stone caps. The gates and railings are in wrought iron.	II
31 Burton Road; 52.83811°N 1.55252°W	—	1907–09	A house designed by Parker and Unwin in Arts and Crafts style. It is in brick and pebbledashing, and has an overhanging tile roof. There are two storeys and an elongated Z-shaped plan with two rectangular blocks. In an angle is a polygonal porch, the windows are casements, there are eyebrow half-dormers, and on the garden front are two full height bow windows.	II
War Memorial, Repton School; 52.84136°N 1.55073°W		1921	The war memorial in the grounds of the school was designed by Forsyth and Maule. It is in sandstone, and consists of three octagonal steps on which is an octagonal base with a moulded top and a Latin inscription, and a square upper base with concave moulding on the top. On this is a tapering shaft, square at the bottom, turning octagonal, with panelled sides, and at the top is a lantern in Decorated style.	II
Telephone kiosk 52.83483°N 1.52549°W		1935	The K6 type telephone kiosk in Milton was designed by Giles Gilbert Scott. Constructed in cast iron with a square plan and a dome, it has three unperforated crowns in the top panels.	II
