= Heath Wood barrow cemetery =

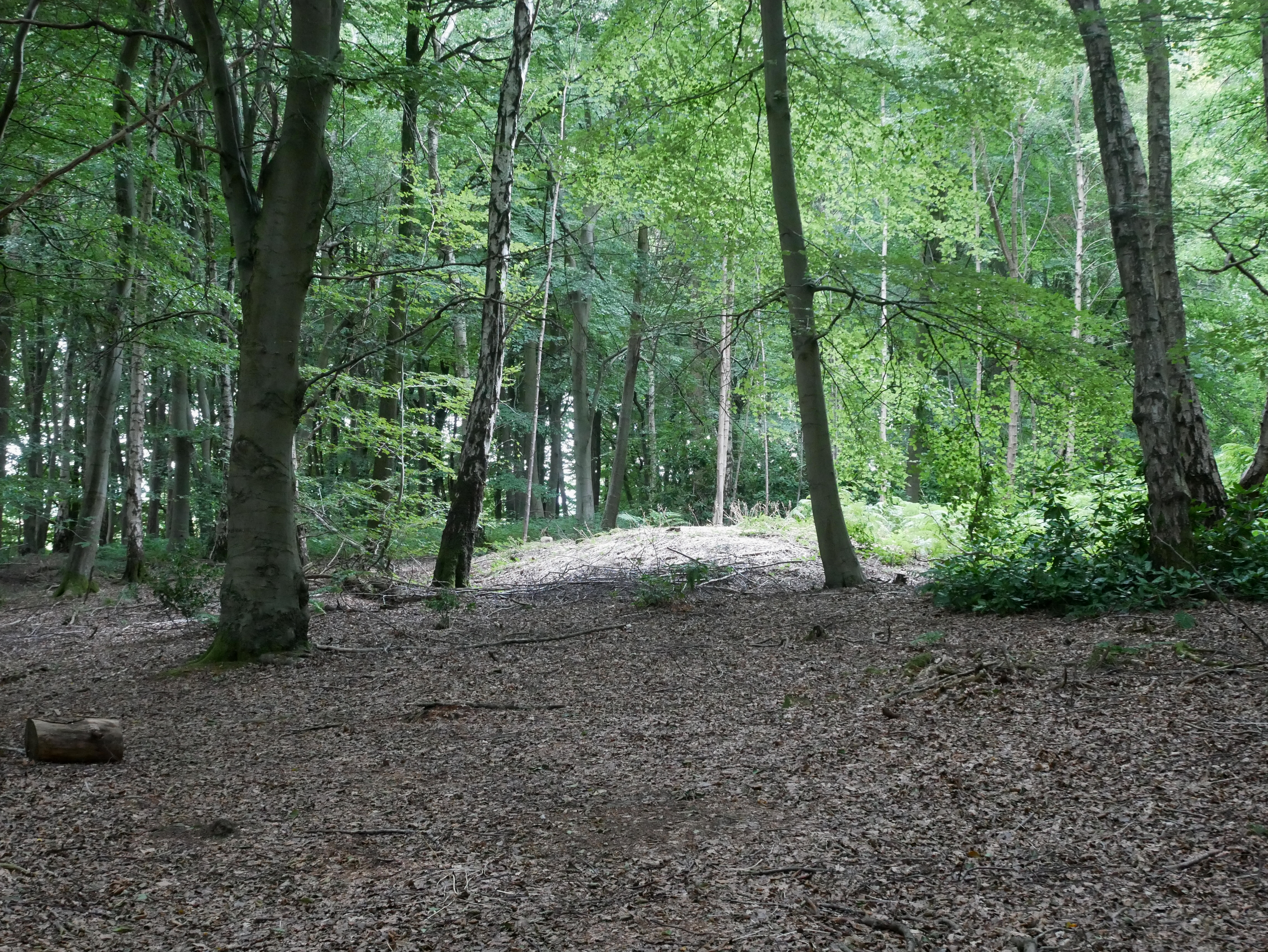
- One of the tumuli in the wood
- Interactive map of Heath Wood barrow cemetery
- 52°49′41″N 1°29′24″W
- Location: Ingleby, Derbyshire

History
- Built: 9th Century AD

Heath Wood barrow cemetery is a Viking burial site near Ingleby, Derbyshire.

== Description ==
Heath Wood contains a series of 59 barrows which is a Viking burial site near Ingleby, Derbyshire. The barrows are unusual because they are the only known Scandinavian cremation site in the British Isles. It is believed to be a war cemetery of the Viking Great Army which arrived in the area in 873 A.D. Early excavations by Thomas Bateman in May 1855 found that some of the mounds were empty cenotaph mounds where the body was not available. or had received a Christian burial in Repton.

Excavations between 1998 and 2000 produced a number of finds which are available in Derby Museum. It is believed that these remains are from the same period as burials discovered in nearby Repton. However, the Repton burials are not cremations. This wood is currently leased by the Forestry Commission from the Church Commissioners and it is designated "Derbyshire 101" as a scheduled monument.

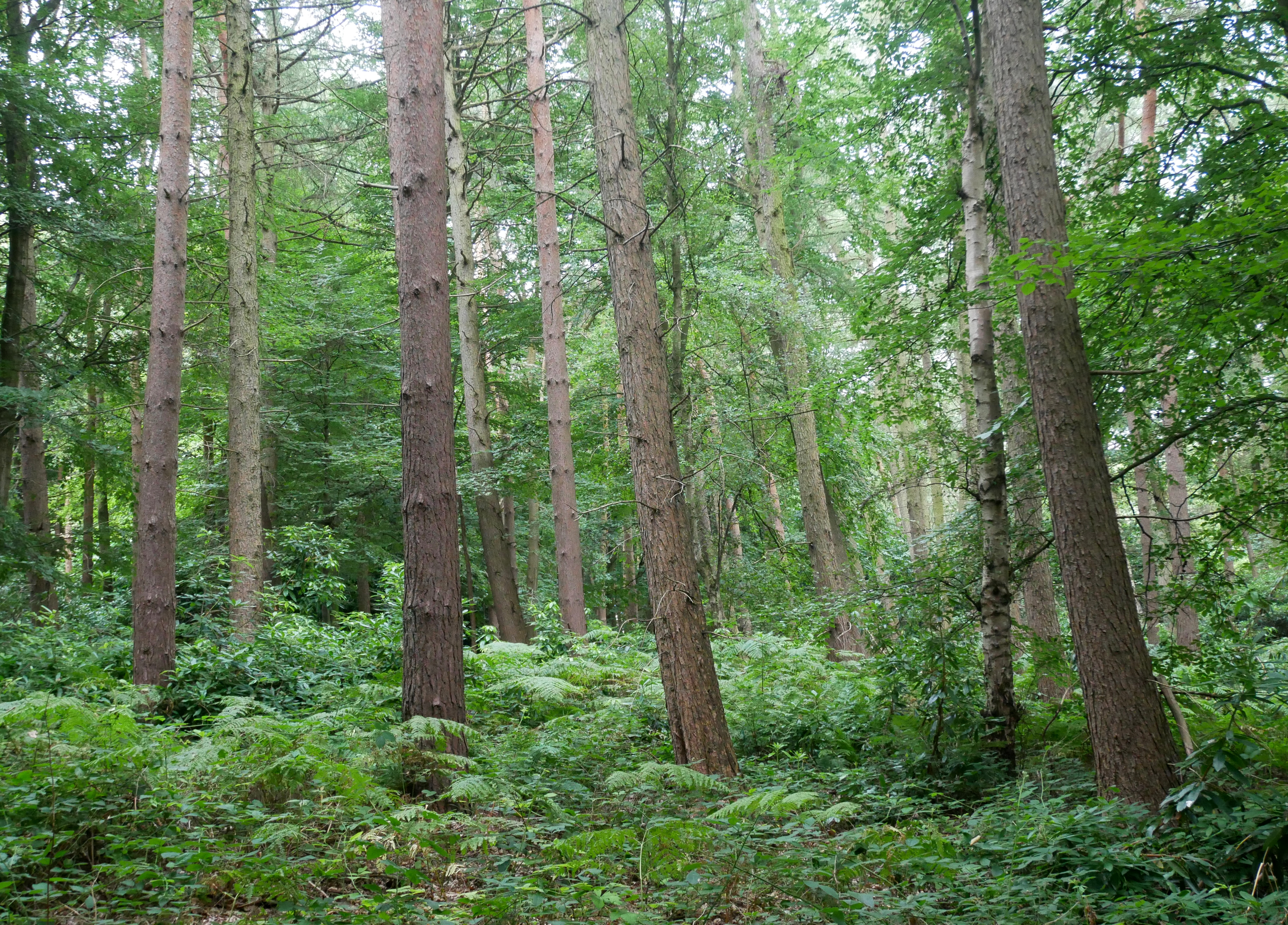
The barrow cemetery is now part of Heath Wood

The path that goes through the wood links Foremarke Hall with Knowle Hill which are two properties previously owned by the Burdett family together with the land belonging to Heath Wood. Presumably, the path was useful when the family moved to Knowle Hill whilst building work was in progress in order to visit St Saviour's church which the family built in 1662. In the eighteenth century Heath Wood was a field and the growth of woodland has happened since. Before the growth of the woods the site would have had a fine view of the Trent valley. The path that goes through the woods neatly misses any of the ancient barrows and it is believed that no barrows were removed to ease its path.
