= Ingleby, Derbyshire =

Hamlet in Derbyshire, England

Coordinates: 52.840°N 1.484°W

Ingleby
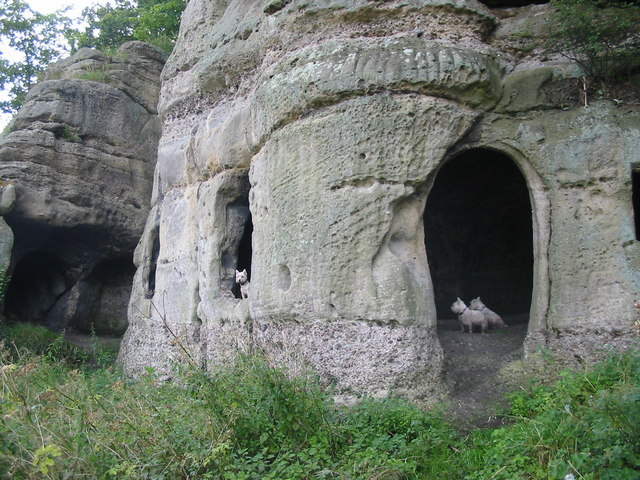
- The nearby Anchorite caves

- Location within Derbyshire
- Population: 85 (2001 census)
- OS grid reference: SK348270
- District: South Derbyshire
- Shire county: Derbyshire
- Region: East Midlands
- Country: England
- Sovereign state: United Kingdom
- Post town: DERBY
- Postcode district: DE73
- Dialling code: 01332
- Police: Derbyshire
- Fire: Derbyshire
- Ambulance: East Midlands
- UK Parliament: South Derbyshire

Ingleby is a hamlet and civil parish in the South Derbyshire district, in Derbyshire, England, situated to the south of the River Trent on a rise between Stanton by Bridge and Repton. In 2001 the parish had a population of 85.

It is the location of Anchor Church, a small series of caves in the sandstone which were the homes of anchorites. The word Ingleby means 'Village of the English'. Nearby places include Stanton by Bridge, Ticknall and the Foremark Reservoir.

Ingleby hosts the Ingleby Art Gallery, and the privately owned John Thompson public house.

== History ==
Vikings erected 59 burial mounds in Heath Wood and the grave goods comprised remnants of swords and wire from Southern Sweden.

In 1009 Æþelræd Unræd (King Ethelred the Unready) signed a charter at the Great Council which recognised the position and boundaries of Weston on Trent as it was given to his minister, Morcar. The land was listed as eight hides at Weston upon Trent, and a hide at Morley, Smalley, Ingleby, Crich and Kidsley.

In the Domesday Book Ingleby is mentioned a number of times, for instance "In Ingleby are 3 bovates of land to the geld. Land for 4 oxen. The soke belongs to Repton. There 3 sokemen have 1 plough and 4 acres (16,000 m^{2}) of meadow and there is 1-acre (4,000 m^{2}) of water meadow." It is also listed under the lands of Nigel of Stafford along with Foremark, Ticknall and Ravenstone.

Anchor Church Caves are beside the Old River Trent; there is a public footpath at the bottom of the crag (or at the top when the river floods in winter). The crag is over 100m long and up to 12m high and in a very attractive setting. The main feature is not the crag at all, but the Hermit's Cave (an anchorite is a hermit). This cave has been cut from the rock (Triassic conglomerate) and is complete with door openings and window holes; it is very unusual. The cave is very old, being mentioned first in 1648. The Old River Trent has an interesting history. The course of the river was altered artificially so that 300 acres (1.2 km^{2}) changed sides. This is commented on in Shakespeare's play Henry IV, Part 1.

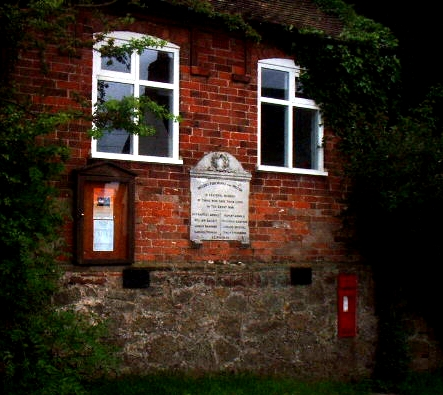
The small public building in Ingleby

"Methinks my moiety, north from Burton here,
In quantity equals not one of yours:
See how this river comes me cranking in,
And cuts me from the best of all my land
A huge half-moon, a monstrous cantle out.
I'll have the current in this place damm'd up;
And here the smug and silver Trent shall run
In a new channel, fair and evenly;
It shall not wind with such a deep indent,
To rob me of so rich a bottom here."

In 1789, Ingleby consisted of just 26 houses. In 1827, Sir Francis Burdett, Bart. M.P. was the Lord of the Manor residing at Foremarke Hall By 1846 the population had grown to over 150, but the number of dwellings (mostly thatched) had risen only slightly to 28. There is mention at this time of an elm tree which is reputed to have been over 600 years old. The tree is last mentioned in 1857.

In 1891, it was reported that the population in 1881 (the last reported census) was 104. Colonel Sir Francis Burdett was still Lord of the Manor and a school that was named after him ran in the village. Erected in 1835 it had an average attendance off 22 pupils but space for four more. In 1935 the population was reported as 98 with the nearest railway station at Chellaston; the nearest post office at Ticknall and the nearest telegraph at Milton.
