= Milton, Derbyshire =

Hamlet in Derbyshire, England

Coordinates: 52.83496°N 1.525642°W

Milton
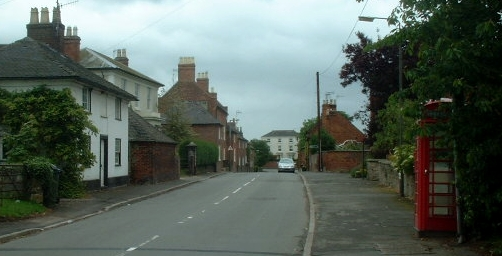
- Milton's main street 2007.

- Location within Derbyshire
- OS grid reference: SK322264
- District: South Derbyshire
- Shire county: Derbyshire
- Region: East Midlands
- Country: England
- Sovereign state: United Kingdom
- Post town: DERBY
- Postcode district: DE65
- Police: Derbyshire
- Fire: Derbyshire
- Ambulance: East Midlands

Milton is a hamlet 6 miles south-west of Derby and 1.5 miles east of Repton. Its population is around 200. It is thought to have been established by the Saxons between 500 and 550 AD. It is featured in the Domesday Book as Berewite of Middletune (Hamlet of Middle Farmstead).

The Swan Inn is now the only pub after the Coach House reverted to a private dwelling in 2000.

Nearby are Ingleby, Bretby, Foremark Reservoir and Foremarke Hall, home to Repton Preparatory School.

== See also ==
- Listed buildings in Repton
