= Listed buildings in Foremark =

Foremark is a civil parish in the South Derbyshire district of Derbyshire, England. The parish contains twelve listed buildings that are recorded in the National Heritage List for England. Of these, two are listed at Grade I, the highest of the three grades, one is at Grade II*, the middle grade, and the others are at Grade II, the lowest grade. The parish contains the village of Foremark and the surrounding area. The most important buildings in the parish are St Saviour's Church and Foremark Hall, which are both listed at Grade I, and most of the other listed buildings in the parish are associated with them. The other listed building is Anchor Church, a natural cave that has been converted for other purposes.

== Key ==
Grade	Criteria
I	Buildings of exceptional interest, sometimes considered to be internationally important
II*	Particularly important buildings of more than special interest
II	Buildings of national importance and special interest

== Buildings ==
Name and location	Photograph	Date	Notes	Grade
St Saviour's Church; 52.83478°N 1.51189°W		1662	The church is built in sandstone on a moulded plinth, and the roof is hidden by embattled parapets. It consists of a nave, a chancel, a west tower and a brick vestry added in the 19th century. The tower has diagonal buttresses, a west doorway with a moulded four-centred arch and a hood mould, above which is a window with a pointed arch and a moulded hood mould, and two-light bell openings. On the sides of the church and at the east end are five-light windows under four-centred arches. Above the east window is a cartouche with a coat of arms and two small figures within strapwork decoration.	I
Foremark Hall; 52.83516°N 1.50796°W		Early 18th century	A country house, largely rebuilt in 1759–61 in Palladian style, and later used as a school. It is in sandstone with hipped Welsh slate roofs and lead-covered domes. There is a rusticated basement, a piano nobile, an attic storey and roof attics, with a dentilled cornice and a balustraded parapet. The north front has 13 bays, a central portico of four unfluted Ionic columns, and double balustraded staircases lead up to the main entrance. The windows are sashes with architraves and pediments. The outer three bays at each end are canted and surmounted by domes. To the east is a service wing attached by a Doric colonnade.	I
Steps, walls and railings southeast of Foremark Hall; 52.83477°N 1.50701°W	—	Early 18th century	The five steps are in sandstone, and lead up to wrought iron pilaster gate piers with ornate openwork decoration topped by strapwork finials. These are flanked by spearhead railings, including a square stone pier with a pyramidal top.	II
Gate piers and walls, St Saviour's Church; 52.83493°N 1.51215°W		Early 18th century	The walls enclosing the churchyard are in sandstone with chamfered copings. To the east of the church are square stone gate piers with moulded cornices and ball finials. Between them are ornate wrought iron gates and a screen, over which are three overthrows. North of the church is another pair of similar gate piers with wrought iron gates.	II*
Kitchen gardens, Foremark Hall; 52.83520°N 1.50484°W	—	Mid-18th century	The kitchen gardens include vine houses, potting sheds, stables, and a garden house. The walls enclosing the rectangular garden are in red brick with stone copings, and are about 4 metres (13 ft) high. In the centre of the west wall is a gateway with four circular brick columns.	II
Anchor Church; 52.84156°N 1.49808°W		Late 18th century	A natural sandstone cave on an escarpment overlooking the River Trent, enlarged and converted into a summer house or folly. There is a round-arched doorway and roughly rectangular windows, and the interior is divided into two rooms.	II
Garden Temple, Foremark Hall; 52.83394°N 1.50300°W	—	Late 18th century	The ornamental temple in the grounds of the hall is in rendered red brick and stone, and is without a roof. There is a circular plan, an open arcade of four Ionic columns to the west, a panelled frieze, a moulded cornice, and a blocking course.	II
Foremark Park Farmhouse; 52.80598°N 1.50182°W	—	Late 18th century	The farmhouse is in red brick, and has a hipped Welsh slate roof with a central well. There are two storeys and seven bays. The central doorway has a moulded surround, and a rectangular fanlight, and the windows are sashes with segmental arches.	II
Home Farmhouse; 52.83398°N 1.51101°W	—	Late 18th century	The farmhouse is in rendered brick with a Welsh slate roof. There are two storeys, a T-shaped plan, and a front of three bays. The central doorway has a rectangular fanlight, and the windows are sashes; all the openings have wedge lintels.	II
Ice house 52.83284°N 1.51018°W	—	Late 18th century (probable)	The ice house is in red brick. It consists of a circular domed structure under an earth mound, with a tunnel vaulted corridor to the north entered by a round-arched doorway.	II
Spring head 52.83314°N 1.51054°W	—	Late 18th century (probable)	The spring head is in sandstone and has a circular plan. It is on a chamfered plinth, and has a moulded cornice, an arched doorway, and three recessed wiundows with moulded surrounds.	II
Wall and balustrade, Foremark Hall; 52.83623°N 1.50773°W		Early 20th century	The retaining wall and the balustraded parapet at the south end of the lake are in concrete. There are 13 bays divided by projecting pilasters, and the walls curve out at the ends. On the side facing the lake, the wall is rusticated.	II
