= St Saviour's Church, Foremark =

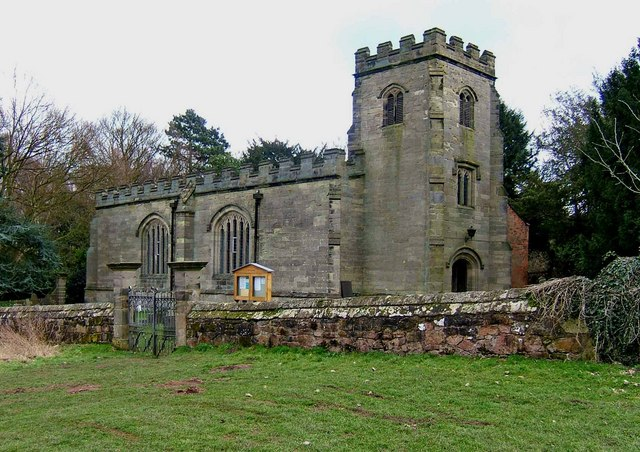
- St Saviour's Church, Foremark
- St Saviour's Church, Foremark
- 52°50′6.71″N 1°30′44.4″W
- Location: Foremark
- Country: England
- Denomination: Church of England

History
- Dedication: St Saviour

Architecture
- Heritage designation: Grade I listed
- Completed: 1662

Administration
- Province: Province of Canterbury
- Diocese: Diocese of Derby
- Archdeaconry: Derby
- Deanery: Repton
- Parish: Foremark

St Saviour's Church, Foremark, is a Grade I listed parish church in the Church of England in Foremark, Derbyshire.

== History ==
The church dates from 1662 and was built by Sir Francis Burdett, 2nd Baronet. The oak lectern was given in 1920 as a memorial to all those who fell in the First World War.

== Parish status ==
The church is in a joint parish with:

- St Mary the Virgin's Church, Newton Solney
- St. Wystan's Church, Repton

== See also ==
- Grade I listed buildings in Derbyshire
- Grade I listed churches in Derbyshire
- Listed buildings in Foremark
