= Repton Prep =

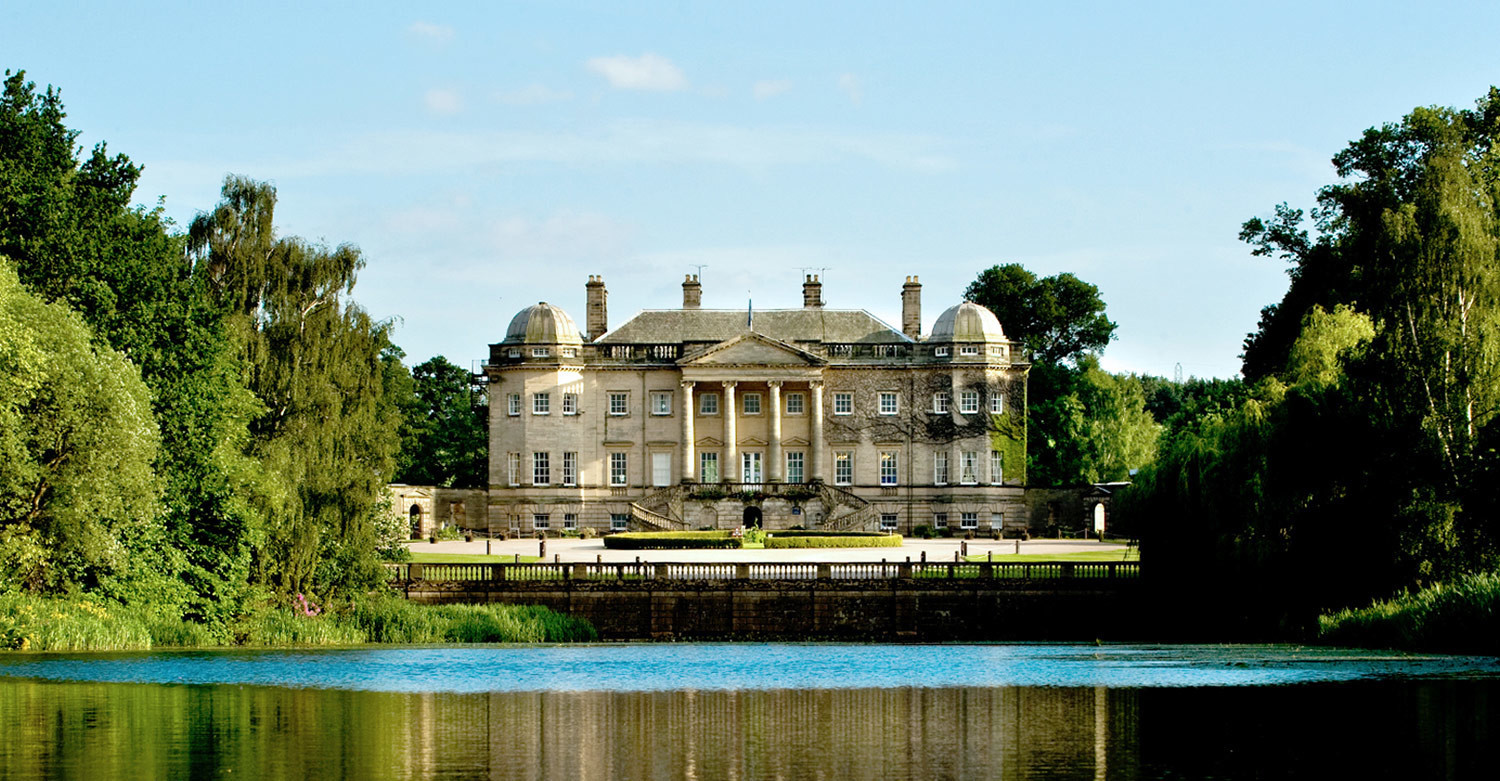
- Foremarke Hall

Location
- Foremark, Milton, Derbyshire, DE65 6EJ; England; 52.8355°N 1.5078°W

Information
- Type: Independent school
- Motto: 'Porta Vacat Culpa' literally 'Blame is empty at the gate'
- Religious affiliation: Anglican
- Established: 1940
- Chairman of Governors: Jonathan M Fry
- Head: Victoria Harding
- Chaplain: Reverend Nick A. Bailey
- Gender: Coeducational
- Age: 3 to 13
- Enrolment: ~450
- Houses: 4
- Colours: Navy & Yellow
- Senior School: Repton School
- Website: https://www.reptonprep.org.uk/

Repton Prep (formally Repton Preparatory School) is a co-educational Private Preparatory School in Foremark, Derbyshire, England which caters for day and boarding pupils aged 3–13 years old. It is commonly referred to as Foremarke Hall – the name given to the stately home (country house, manor house) of the manor of Foremark which is the main building of the school.

It has a close relationship with its senior school, Repton School.

== Early history ==
The prep school was founded in 1940 as a result of the drop of numbers and entries into Repton School- a result of travel inconvenience amidst uncertainties created in Britain during World War II which threatened the continuation of the Senior School. By establishing a junior section, it quickly guaranteed a secured number of students who were to enter Repton School for secondary education. The school appointed Mr. B.W. Thomas as its first Headmaster(1940–1947).

The school used Repton premises- 'The Cross House' at first for convenience partly because there was insufficient time and funds to secure and set up a proper campus, but mostly because it was unnecessary – Repton School has a large campus. By the end of the war, there were more than a 100 boys attending the prep school.

=== Foremarke Hall ===
Following this expansion, a new campus was needed to offer the boys the accommodation they deserved, and such a site became available in 1947 – Foremarke Hall and surrounding buildings in the manor of Foremark. The country house was used as a Military Hospital during World War I and an Officer Cadet Training Unit during World War II. The army moved out in 1946 and Repton Prep settled in the new campus in 1947, leaving Mr. Thomas at Repton School, where he became Housemaster of Latham. Mr. Ken Jackson took over as the 2nd Headmaster(1947–1960), and the first to head the school in its new campus. The school rented the campus from the Church Commission, and purchased the free-hold of Foremarke Hall along with 40 acres of land (practically the entire manor-grounds) and 3 cottages in the Manor.

Foremarke Hall (the Manor house) and its Annex do not house any academic departments; instead they contain two Boys' Boarding Houses, Heads of Boarding-Houses' accommodations, the Surgery & Sick Bay, the Headmaster & Secretaries' offices, the Staff Common Room and the School Library. The Annex holds a Flexible-Boarding house, a Games Room, the School Laundry as well as the Kitchen & Catering area.

== Departments ==
The school's academic departments tend to have their own individual buildings like that of the faculties of Universities.

== Old Foremarkians ==
Notable alumni of Foremarke who then went on to Repton School include:

Tom Chambers (Actor) Will Hughes (Derby County Midfielder) Georgie Twigg (International British Field Hockey Player)

== See also ==
- Foremark
- Foremarke Hall
- Prep School
- Boarding School
- Repton School
