= Foremarke Hall =

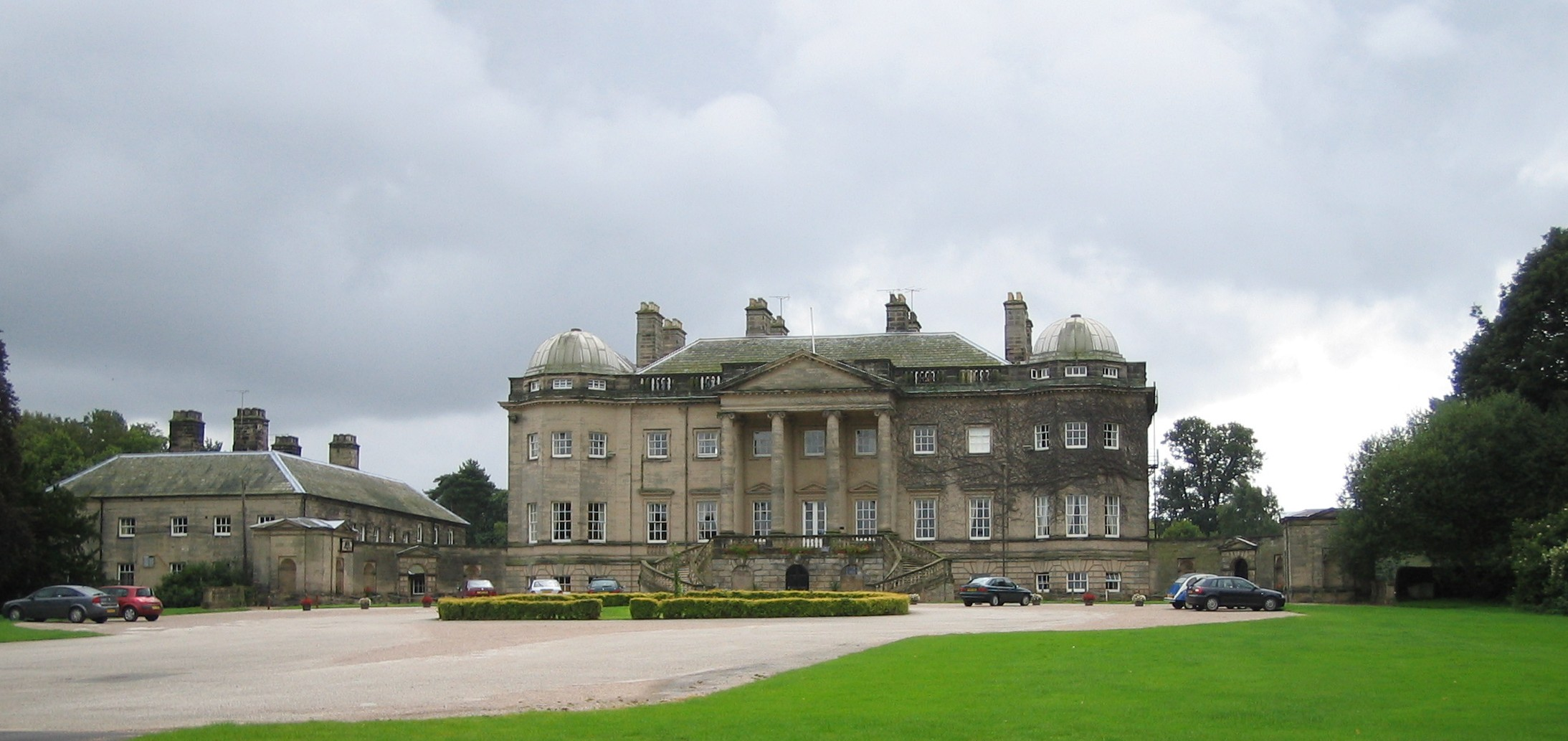

- Location within Derbyshire
- Alternative names: Foremark Hall

General information
- Status: Preparatory school
- Architectural style: Georgian-Palladian
- Location: Foremark, Derbyshire, United Kingdom
- Coordinates: 52.8355°N 1.5078°W
- Current tenants: Repton Preparatory School
- Construction started: 1759
- Completed: 1761

Listed Building – Grade I
- Official name: Foremark Hall
- Designated: 2 September 1952
- Reference no.: 1096531

Foremarke Hall is a Georgian-Palladian country house and manor house. Completed in 1762, the Hall is located at the manor (hamlet) of Foremark, near the hamlets of Ingleby, Ticknall, Milton, and the village of Repton in South Derbyshire, England.

It is the current home of the Repton Preparatory School (known as Repton Prep). Before becoming the Preparatory School, Foremarke Hall was the ancestral home of the Burdett family of Bramcote. It is a Grade I listed building.

The school and a Great Western Railway "Foremarke Hall" class steam locomotive, no. 7903, are named after this hall.

== The preparatory school ==
Repton Prep, housed in Foremarke Hall and its grounds, is a school for boys and girls, day and boarding, from ages 3–13. Founded in 1940 to meet the schooling and boarding needs caused by the Second World War, it was originally established in 1940 at "The Cross" in Repton with just eight boys. In 1942 it moved to Latham House, which was part of Repton School. By the end of the War there were over 100 boys in the prep school, but as the senior school numbers increased the prep school was in danger of being closed or squeezed out. Fortunately Foremarke Hall became available.

"The army moved out of Foremarke Hall in 1946 and Repton school moved in 1947, renting the building from the Church Commissioners. The school was able to purchased the freehold of the current campus in 1967 with 40 acres (160,000 m^{2}) of land and three cottages of the Hamlet." P. Brewster, 2002

== The building ==
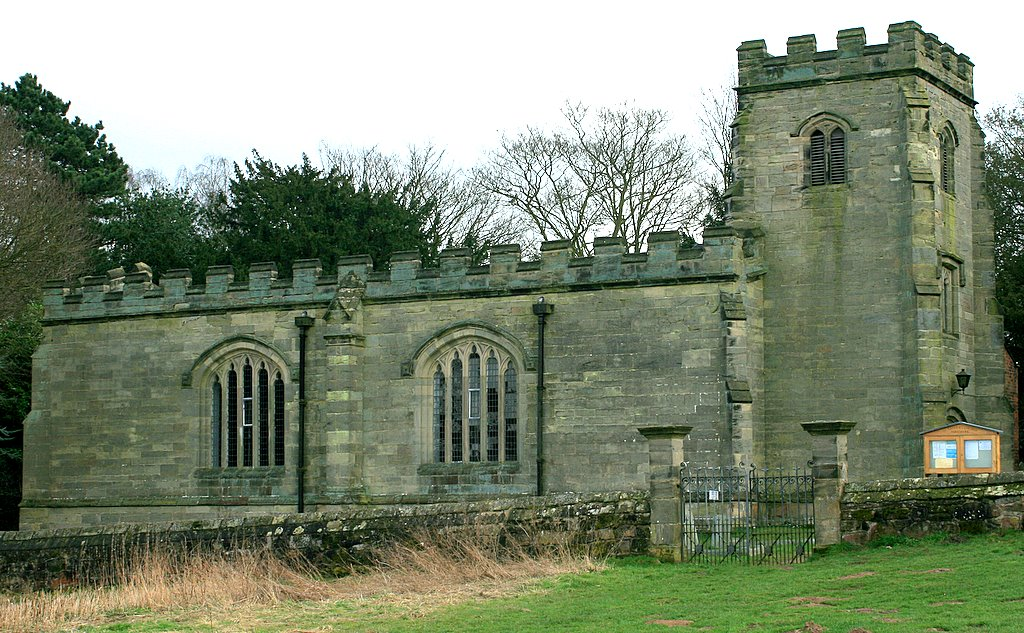
St Saviour's church

It is known that there was a building on this site in 1712 but it can be assumed that it may have already been there some time as Sir Francys Burdett built the nearby Saint Saviour's Church in 1662 and the hall was large and convenient with a hearth tax of 24 hearths.

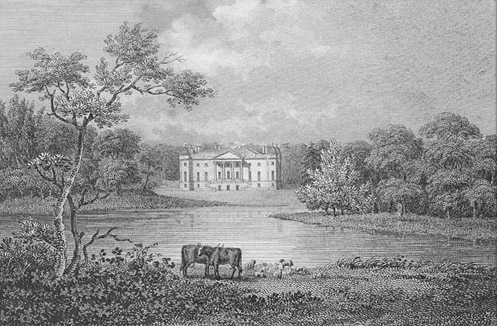
Foremarke Hall drawn by G. Shepherd, engraved by W. Angus. 1805

The present building was built in 1759 to 1761; and is of Georgian and Palladian architectural style with an imposing portico, cursive and round domes, chamber, pillars and a magnificent south front. A double spiral staircase leads up to the 1st floor – to the rectangular balcony and pillared front entrance of the Hall and into the approximately 1,000 square feet (93 m^{2}) main hall/living area of the building which consists of two large imposing fireplaces and a glass chandelier. The entrance is decorated with a tall black wooden double-door, accompanied by equally impressive checker-framed windows. There is an imposing back entrance on the far side of the main hall with identical doors and windows, and which leads to a decorated ornamental patio-courtyard. Another balcony sits outside the back entrance but is connected to imposing angular staircases on either side with right-angled twists; instead of the spiral ones found on the front face. All the staircases and balconies are fenced with stylised pillar columns. There is a doorway situated on ground level centred in between the imposing staircases, beneath both the front and rear entrances. At the front main entrance, the doorway is sealed by a black wooden door and leads slightly down into a storage room; which nowadays also houses the water boiler. The doorway at the rear entrance leads into a short tunnel and into the corridor of the ground floor; which is now a boarding house. In addition, an Annex was built as a Guesthouse and to house the Lord's retinue with a corridor at ground floor linking the two buildings. The Hall is four storeys high and consists of a large hall on the second floor with an infamous portrait of Burdett whose eyes Foremarke teachers and students claim 'seem to be staring directly at them in whatever angle'. After the manor house was rendered part of Repton Prep School a store room was built halfway in between the 1st and 2nd floor above the headmaster's offices to house instruments.

On the 2nd floor, in between the Library and the Main Hall, the 3rd floor is hollowed to give a large two-storey space in which large portrait-paintings of Sir Francis 5th Bart.and his wife Sophia, Lady Burdett as well as his father, Francis Burdett, are hung. An L-shaped velvet-carpeted staircase next to the library door leads up to the 3rd-floor, household which is lined with Georgian carved wood-fencings. A chandelier hangs from the roof of the two-storey area. Steps on the 2nd floor lead down to the 1st floor, occupied by Francis boarding house.

== History ==
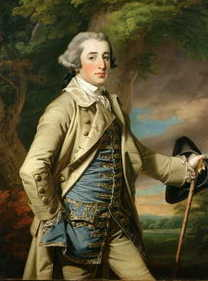
Sir Robert's son Francis Burdett by Francis Cotes in 1764. He is the father of Sir Francis Burdett and was never a baronet as he died before Sir Robert did.

Foremarke Hall was commissioned to be built as a stately home in 1760 by Sir Robert Burdett for his son Francis Burdett (not to be confused with the latter's son Sir Francis Burdett). The architect was David Hiorns, a famous architect then whose architectural firm in London still thrives today.

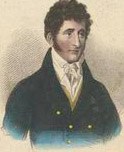
Bust-Portrait of a very young Sir Francis Burdett.

According to a directory published in 1846, the hall was "erected about the year 1762" by Sir Robert Burdett (4th Bart. of Foremark), replacing an earlier house on the site, and making it one of the oldest local buildings. However, the nearby parish church – St Saviour's Church, Ingleby – was erected and consecrated in 1662 by Sir Francis Burdett 2nd Bart. of Foremark

The hamlets of Ingleby and Foremarke (sometimes referred to as a manor) were under the Lordship of and owned by the Sir Francis Burdett, 5th Baronet in 1829. The Baronetage of his family line began with Sir Thomas Burdett on 25 February 1619, who was registered on the Baronetage census as "Burdett of Bramcote, Warwicks". Francis married Sophia Coutts, daughter of the wealthy banker Thomas Coutts, in 1793, which brought him a fortune.

In 1835, the hall was described thus:

"Foremark, three miles west from Melbourn, is distinguished as having within its precincts the beautiful seat of Sir Francis Burdett, most judiciously and romantically placed, amidst scenery of a rich, bold and varied character, upon the southern banks of the Trent – the hanging hills being crowned by thriving plantations. The house is spacious, and its appearance imposing to a considerable degree; the pleasure-grounds are very tasteful, and lead down a valley, through finely wooded avenues to the banks of the river. The church, here, which is dedicated to our Saviour, is a small, plain edifice: the living is a perpetual curacy, in the patronage of Sir Francis Burdett. The parish of Foremark (including Ingleby township, 163) contained, in 1831, 221 inhabitants."

The Burdett family owned the hall until 1850 when Henry Allsop esquire resided there. It could be that Henry Allsop was not the owner as the Burdett family were still reported as the owners in 1881.

In 1932, Kelly's directory reported:

Major Sir Francis Burdett bart. D.L., J.P. lord of the manor and sole landowner, [has] a fine stone mansion, surrounded by beautiful trees and shrubs; in the grounds is a lake of considerable dimensions.

During the course of World War I the hall was taken over by the British army as a military hospital. During World War II it was used as an Officer Cadet Training Unit; the military identification plate nailed to one of the pillars of the front entrance is still present.

The Manor may be spelled Foremark or Foremarke (though usually the former), but the stately home – i.e. Foremarke Hall – is always spelled Foremarke. In autumn 1972 the BBC filmed scenes from Jane Eyre at Foremarke Hall. Girls from John Port School in Etwall played pupils at Jane's school, Lowfield, in outdoor scenes.

== See also ==
- Landed gentry
- Angela Burdett-Coutts, 1st Baroness Burdett-Coutts
- Historic house
- List of historic houses in England
- Treasure Houses of England
- Grade I listed buildings in Derbyshire
- Listed buildings in Foremark
