= Percy Guarin =

Filipino association football player

- Born: Percy Piñero Guarin
- Title: President of the Misamis Oriental Camiguin Ginggoog El Salvador and Cagayan de Oro Regional Football Association
- Term: 2015–present
- Predecessor: Ismael C. Batiles
Association football career
College career
| Years | Team | Apps | (Gls) |
- Silliman University
- San Beda College
Senior career*
| Years | Team | Apps | (Gls) |
- San Miguel Corporation
- CDCP
International career
| 1979–1983 | Philippines (youth) | | |
| 1981–1983 | Philippines | | |
- * Club domestic league appearances and goals

Percy Piñero Guarin is a former Filipino international footballer, coach and sports official.

== Early life ==
Guarin took up football at age 10 and the sport was the pastime of his closest friends and family in Dumaguete.

== Football career ==
=== Playing career ===
==== Collegiate ====
Guarin played for the football team of Silliman University and later San Beda College. He was enrolled in both institutions.

===== Club =====
Guarin played for the San Miguel Corporation Football Team and the Construction Development Corporation of the Philippines Football Team.

==== International ====
In 1979, The scouts of the Philippine Football Federation selected him to participate in a try-out for the Philippine national youth football team. Out of the 60 other children, Guarin was among the few who officially managed to make it to the team after undergoing three months of training. He was part of the youth team under Z.Goll from 1979 to 1983.

Guarin entered the senior national team in 1981. Among other selected national team players, he participated in cultural exchange football activities between the Philippines and the former Soviet Union in 1983. He also played for the national team at the 1981 and 1983 Southeast Asian Games.

=== As a coach and sports official ===
In Manila, Guarin secured an AFC C license in 1996 and later attained an AFC B license in Bacolod in 1997. Guarin went to Thailand in 2002 to accomplish an AFC Instructors Course. Guarin secured an AFC Conditioning Certificate in Kuala Lumpur, Malaysia and an International Coaching Certificate in Germany in 2004. Guarin also went to Fukushima, Japan in 2007 where he accomplished and passed the Japan Football Association C License International Course.

In 2014, Guarin joined other select coaches of the Philippine under-11 team at Loughborough University in England where the underwent training.

On January 10, 2015, Guarin was elected as president of the then-named Cagayan Misamis Oriental Football Association (now the Misamis Oriental Camiguin Ginggoog El Salvador and Cagayan de Oro Regional Football Association) succeeding Ismael C. Batiles who served for 8 years.

==== Programs ====
He initiated football programs in Cagayan de Oro. Among his most noted projects is the "All Heart for your Dreams" program which involved collaboration with sports associations in the city, the conduction of football clinics for children for free, and the scouting for new talents. As part of Guarin's program, the Cagayan de Oro football center, the Liga Estudiantes, and the Mindanao 1 Futbol were established and the project "Happiness" was launched.

Guarin however had limited projects in Misamis Oriental due to a lack of support from the football association and at times the association itself is inactive. He collaborated with friends, officials, and teachers from the Department of Education for his projects.

== Personal life ==
Guarin settled with his wife in 1987. He officially started to reside in Cagayan de Oro in 2008.
