= Great Heathen Army =

Norse invasion of England in 865

- Part of the Viking invasions of England
- A map of the routes taken by the Great Heathen Army from 865 to 886
Date	865–878
Location	England
Result	Treaty of Alfred and Guthrum: Creation of the Danelaw

Belligerents
Vikings; Danes; Norwegians; Swedes	Anglo-Saxon kingdoms: Wessex; Northumbria; Mercia; East Anglia

Commanders and leaders
Halfdan Ragnarsson; Ivar the Boneless; Ubba †; Guthrum the Old; Bagsecg †	Æthelwulf of Wessex; Æthelred of Wessex; Alfred the Great; Ælla of Northumbria †; Osberht of Northumbria †; Burgred of Mercia; Edmund of East Anglia †

Strength
Unknown	Unknown

Great Heathen Army
- Leaders: Halfdan Ragnarsson; Ivar the Boneless; Ubba †; Guthrum the Old; Bagsecg
- Founded: c. 865
- Dates active: 865–878
- Country: Various Norse petty kingdoms of Sweden, Norway and Denmark and other colonies
- Headquarters: Danelaw
- Active regions: Anglo-Saxon England
- Size: Under a thousand to low thousands (est)

The Great Heathen Army, (Note: Old English: mycel hæþen here; Danish: Store Hedenske Hær) also known as the Great Danish Army and the Viking Great Army, was a coalition of Scandinavian warriors mainly originating in Denmark who invaded England in AD 865. Since the late 8th century, the Vikings (Note: The Anglo-Saxons regarded the word wicing as synonymous with pirate. They did not regard it as being a reference to nationality. There were other terms that were used, that did refer to nationality, such as Nordmen (Northmen) and Dene (Dane). In various Old English sources the word wicing is translated into the Latin pirata whatever the nationality of the raiders may have been. In Asser's 'Life of Alfred' the Danes are referred to as pagani (pagan) not pirata (pirate). However, Asser's Latin pagani is more often than not translated, into English texts, as 'the Vikings' which is a mistranslation.) had been engaging in raids on centres of wealth, such as monasteries. The Great Heathen Army was much larger and aimed to conquer and occupy the four kingdoms of East Anglia, Northumbria, Mercia and Wessex.

The name Great Heathen Army is derived from the Anglo-Saxon Chronicle. The force was led by three of the five sons of the semi-legendary Ragnar Lodbrok, including Halfdan Ragnarsson, Ivar the Boneless and Ubba. (Note: The Danish historian Saxo Grammaticus gives Ragnar no less than ten sons; however, the Anglo-Saxon Chronicle says that only three took part in the invasion. It is likely that the sagas of Ragnar and his sons, although based in history, were a literary invention. The historical foundation is more likely found in the French and English chronicles.) The campaign of invasion and conquest against the Anglo-Saxon kingdoms lasted 14 years. Surviving sources give no firm indication of its numbers, but it was described as amongst the largest forces of its kind.

The invaders initially landed in East Anglia, where King Edmund provided them with horses for their campaign in return for peace. They spent the winter of 865–866 at Thetford, before marching north to capture York in November 866. York had been founded as the Roman legionary fortress of Eboracum and revived as the Anglo-Saxon trading port of Eoforwic. During 867, the army marched deep into Mercia and wintered in Nottingham. The Mercians agreed to terms with the Viking army, which moved back to York for the winter of 868–869. In 869, the Great Army returned to East Anglia, conquering it and killing its king. The army moved to winter quarters in Thetford.

In 871, the Vikings moved on to Wessex, where Alfred the Great paid them to leave. The army then marched to London to overwinter in 871–872. The following campaigning season the army first moved to York, where it gathered reinforcements. This force campaigned in northeastern Mercia, after which it spent the winter at Torksey, on the Trent close to the Humber. The following campaigning season it seems to have subdued much of Mercia. Burgred, the king of Mercia, fled overseas and Ceolwulf, described in the Anglo-Saxon Chronicle as "a foolish king's thegn" was imposed in his place. The army spent the following winter at Repton on the middle Trent, after which the army seems to have divided. One group seems to have returned to Northumbria, where they settled in the area, while another group seems to have turned to invade Wessex.

By this time, only the kingdom of Wessex had not been conquered. In May 878 Alfred the Great defeated the Vikings at the Battle of Edington, and a treaty was agreed whereby the Vikings were able to remain in control of much of northern and eastern England, a region later known as the Danelaw, which was formalised in the Treaty of Alfred and Guthrum.

The Anglo-Saxon Chronicle does not mention the reason for this invasion, perhaps because Viking raids were fairly common during that period. The Tale of Ragnar's Sons, on the other hand, mentions that the invasion of England by the Great Heathen Army was aimed at avenging the death of Ragnar Lodbrok, a legendary Viking ruler of Sweden and Denmark. (Note: There is nothing in the annals to suggest that the brothers invaded England to avenge their father's killing. Also there is no reference to them being the sons of Ragnar.) In the Viking saga, Ragnar is said to have conducted a raid on Northumbria during the reign of King Ælla. The Vikings were defeated and Ragnar was captured by the Northumbrians. Ælla then had Ragnar executed by throwing him into a pit of venomous snakes. When the sons of Ragnar received news of their father's death, they decided to avenge him.

== Background ==
Viking (Note: The word "Viking" is a historical revival; it was not used in Middle English, but it was revived from Old Norse vikingr "freebooter, sea-rover, pirate, Viking", which usually is explained as meaning properly "one who came from the fjords" from vik "creek, inlet, small bay" (cf. Old English wic, Middle High German wich "bay", and the second element in Reykjavik). But Old English wicing and Old Frisian wizing are almost 300 years older, and probably derive from wic "village, camp" (temporary camps were a feature of the Viking raids), related to Latin vicus "village, habitation".) raids began in England in the late 8th century, primarily on monasteries. The Anglo-Saxon Chronicle entry for AD 787 (Note: Maybe AD 789.) reports the first confrontation with the Vikings in England.

AD 787 – This year king Bertric took to wife Eadburga, king Offa's daughter; and in his days first came three ships of Northmen, out of Hæretha-land [Denmark]. And then the reeve rode to the place, and would have driven them to the king's town, because he knew not who they were: and they there slew him. These were the first ships of Danishmen which sought the land of the English nation.

This incident is regarded, by some, as the first raid on England. Æthelweard's version of the Chronicle, known as the Chronicon Æthelweardi, has a slightly different version of events, saying that the reeve, a certain Beaduheard, had spoken to the visitors in an "authoritative tone" and this is why they killed him. The designation of these "Hæretha-landers" as Danes is somewhat problematic. Sara María Pons-Sanz states, in "Analysis of the Scandinavian Loanwords in the Aldredian Glosses to the Lindisfarne Gospels", that they were either men from Harthæsysæl (Hardsyssel) in Jutland, so actually Danes, or from Hörthaland in Norway, so that in the last case the word "Danish" refers to all Scandinavian people.

The first monastery to be raided was in 793 at Lindisfarne, off the northeast coast; the Anglo-Saxon Chronicle described the Vikings as "heathen men". Monasteries and minster churches were popular targets as they were wealthy and had valuable, portable objects. The Anglo-Saxon Chronicle for 840 says that Æthelwulf of Wessex was defeated at Carhampton, Somerset, after 35 Viking ships had landed in the area. The Annals of St. Bertin also reported the incident, stating:

The Northmen launched a major attack; in three days, the Northmen emerged the winners – plundering, looting, slaughtering, and controlling the land. (Note: The Annals of Bertin mention the attack as happening in 844, compared to 840 in the Anglo Saxon Chronicle.)

Despite this, Æthelwulf had some success against the Vikings. The Anglo-Saxon Chronicle has repeated references during his reign of victories won by ealdormen with the men of their shires. However, the raiding of England continued on and off until the 860s, when instead of raiding, the Vikings changed their tactics and sent a great army to invade England. This army was described by the Anglo-Saxon Chronicle as a "Great Heathen Army" (OE: mycel hæþen here or mycel heathen here).

=== The size of the army ===
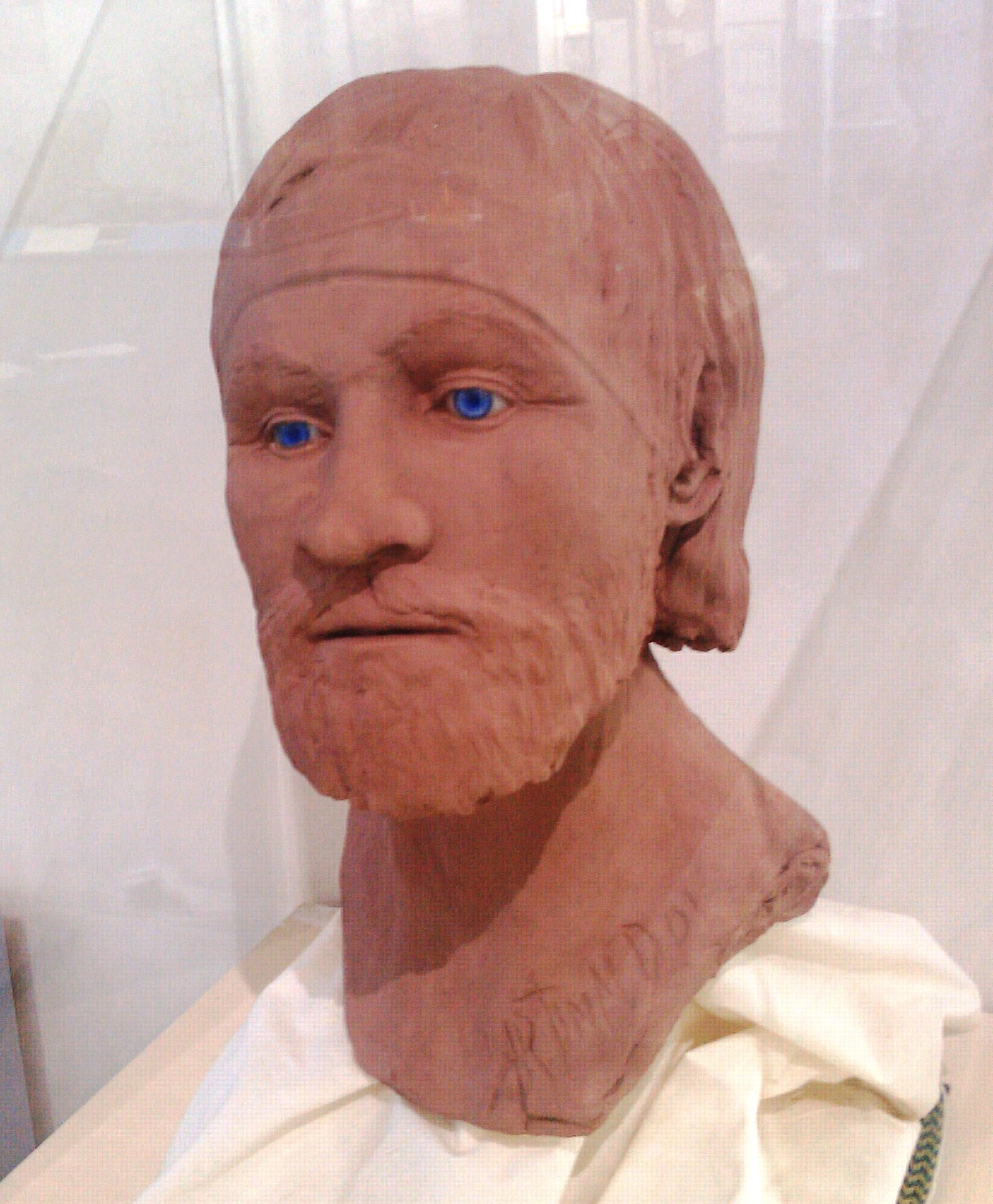
A reconstruction of a Viking from Repton in Mercia. This model is now in Derby Museum. (Note: This reconstruction was made in 1985 by the BBC for a programme called Blood of the Vikings based on a skull and sword found in a burial outside St. Wystan's Church, Repton)

Historians provide varying estimates (Note: For example, Sturdy, argues that the great army would have numbered less than 1000 men; Smyth, supports a great army of over 1000 men; and Abels suggests that the great army may have initially numbered 'in excess of 5000 combatants'.) for the size of the Great Heathen Army. According to the 'minimalist' scholars, such as Pete Sawyer, the army may have been smaller than traditionally thought. Sawyer notes that the Anglo-Saxon Chronicle of 865 referred to the Viking force as a Heathen Army, or in Old English "hæþen here".

The law code of King Ine of Wessex, issued in about 694, provides a definition of here (pronounced /ˈheːre/) as "an invading army or raiding party containing more than thirty-five men", thus differentiating between the term for the invading Viking army and the Anglo-Saxon army that was referred to as the fyrd. The scribes who wrote the Anglo-Saxon Chronicle used the term here to describe the Viking forces. The historian Richard Abels suggested that this was to differentiate between the Viking war bands and those of military forces organised by the state or the crown. By the late 10th and early 11th century, here was used more generally as the term for an army, whether it was Viking or not.

Sawyer produced a table of Viking ship numbers, as documented in the Anglo-Saxon Chronicle, and assumes that each Viking ship could carry no more than 32 men (Note: The Viking ship wrecks, discovered at Skuldelev, Denmark, indicate that a small longship (wreck 5) could carry approximately 30 men and a great longship (wreck 2) could carry 65–70. The saga of Ragnar's sons describes how they used knorrs (cargo ships) to carry warriors, each knorr carrying 250 men.) leading to his conclusion that the army would have consisted of no more than 1,000 men. Other scholars give higher estimates. For example, Laurent Mazet-Harhoff observes that many thousands of men were involved in the invasions of the Seine area. Mazet-Harhoff concedes that the military bases that would accommodate these large armies have yet to be rediscovered. Guy Halsall reported that, in the 1990s, several historians suggested that the Great Heathen Army would have numbered in the low thousands and acknowledged that there "is still much room for debate".

The army probably developed from the campaigns in Francia, where there was a conflict between Emperor Louis the Pious and his sons. One of the sons, Lothair I, had welcomed the support from a Viking fleet. By the time the war had ended, the Vikings had discovered that monasteries and towns situated on navigable rivers were vulnerable to attack. In 845, a raid on Paris was prevented by a large payment of silver to the Vikings. The opportunity for rich pickings drew other Vikings to the area, and by the end of the decade all the main rivers of West Francia were being patrolled by Viking fleets. In 862, the West Frankish king responded to the Vikings, fortifying his towns and defending his rivers, making it difficult for the Vikings to raid inland. The lower reaches of the rivers and the coastal regions were left largely undefended. Religious communities in these areas moved inland away from the reaches of the Viking fleets. With the changes in Francia making raiding more difficult, the Vikings turned their attention to England.

== Invasion of England ==
The Viking leaders often joined together for mutual benefit and then dissolved once profit had been achieved. Several of the Viking leaders who had been active in Francia and Frisia joined forces to conquer the four kingdoms constituting Anglo-Saxon England. The composite force probably contained elements from Denmark, Norway, Sweden, and Ireland as well as those who had been fighting on the continent. The Anglo-Saxon historian Æthelweard was very specific in his chronicle and said that "the fleets of the viking tyrant Ivar the Boneless landed in England from the north".

The Vikings had been defeated by the West Saxon King Æthelwulf in 851, so rather than land in Wessex they decided to go further north to East Anglia. Legend has it that the united army was led by the three sons of Ragnar Lodbrok: Halfdan Ragnarsson, Ivar the Boneless (Hingwar), and Ubba. Norse sagas consider the invasion by the three brothers as a response to the death of their father at the hands of Ælla of Northumbria in 865, but the historicity of this claim is uncertain.

=== Start of the invasion, 865 ===
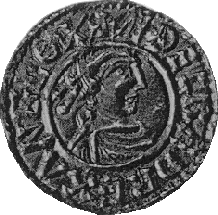
Silver penny of Æthelred I, King of Wessex (865–871)

In late 865, the Great Heathen Army encamped in the Isle of Thanet and was promised by the people of Kent danegeld in exchange for peace. The Vikings did not abide by this agreement and rampaged across eastern Kent.

The Vikings used East Anglia as a starting point for an invasion. The East Anglians made peace with the invaders by providing them with horses. The Vikings stayed in East Anglia for the winter before setting out for Northumbria towards the end of 866, establishing themselves at York. In 867, the Northumbrians paid danegeld, and the Viking Army established a puppet leader in Northumbria before setting off for the Kingdom of Mercia, where in 867 they captured Nottingham. The king of Mercia requested help from the king of Wessex to help fight the Vikings. A combined army from Wessex and Mercia besieged the city of Nottingham with no clear result, so the Mercians settled on paying the Vikings off. The Vikings returned to Northumbria in autumn 868 and overwintered in York, staying there for most of 869. They returned to East Anglia and spent the winter of 869–870 at Thetford. While in Thetford, they were attacked by Edmund, king of East Anglia, with whom they had no peace agreement. The Viking army was victorious in these battles, and Edmund was captured, possibly tortured, and killed. He later came to be known as Edmund the Martyr.

Map of Britain in 878, showing territory held by the Danes in pink

In 871, the Great Summer Army arrived from Scandinavia, led by Bagsecg. The reinforced Viking army turned its attention to Wessex but the West Saxons, led by King Æthelred's brother Alfred, defeated them on 8 January 871 at the Battle of Ashdown, slaying Bagsecg in the process. Three months later, Æthelred died and was succeeded by Alfred (later known as Alfred the Great), who bought (Note: Asser actually uses the term "make peace". historians have suggested that this means paying the Vikings money in return for peace. See Asser ch. 10 where he explicitly says that the men from Kent paid money in return for peace.) the Vikings off to gain time. During 871–872, the Great Heathen Army wintered in London before returning to Northumbria. It seems that there had been a rebellion against the puppet ruler in Northumbria, so they returned to restore power. They then established their winter quarters for 872–873 at Torksey in the Kingdom of Lindsey (now part of Lincolnshire). The Mercians again paid them off in return for peace, and at the end of 873 the Vikings took up winter quarters at Repton in Derbyshire.

In 874, following their winter stay in Repton, the Great Heathen Army drove the Mercian king into exile and finally conquered Mercia. The exiled Mercian king was replaced by Ceolwulf. According to Alfred the Great's biographer Asser, the Vikings then split into two bands. Halfdan led one band north to Northumbria, where he overwintered by the river Tyne (874–875). In 875, he ravaged further north to Scotland, where he fought the Picts and the Britons of Strathclyde. Returning south of the border in 876, he shared out Northumbrian land among his men, who "ploughed the land and supported themselves." This land was part of what became known as the Danelaw.

=== King Alfred's victory ===
According to Asser, the second band was led by Guthrum, Oscetel, and Anwend. This group also left Repton in 874 and established a base at Cambridge for the winter of 874–875. In late 875 they moved onto Wareham, where they raided the surrounding area and occupied a fortified position. Asser reports that Alfred made a treaty with the Vikings to get them to leave Wessex. The Vikings left Wareham, but it was not long before they were raiding other parts of Wessex, and initially they were successful. Alfred fought back, however, and eventually won victory over them at the Battle of Edington in 878. This was followed closely by what was described by Asser as the Treaty of Wedmore, where Guthrum agreed to be baptised and then for him and his army to leave Wessex. Then some time after, the Treaty of Alfred and Guthrum was agreed, that set out the boundaries between Alfred and Guthrum's territories as well as agreements on peaceful trade, and the weregild value of their people.

== Aftermath ==
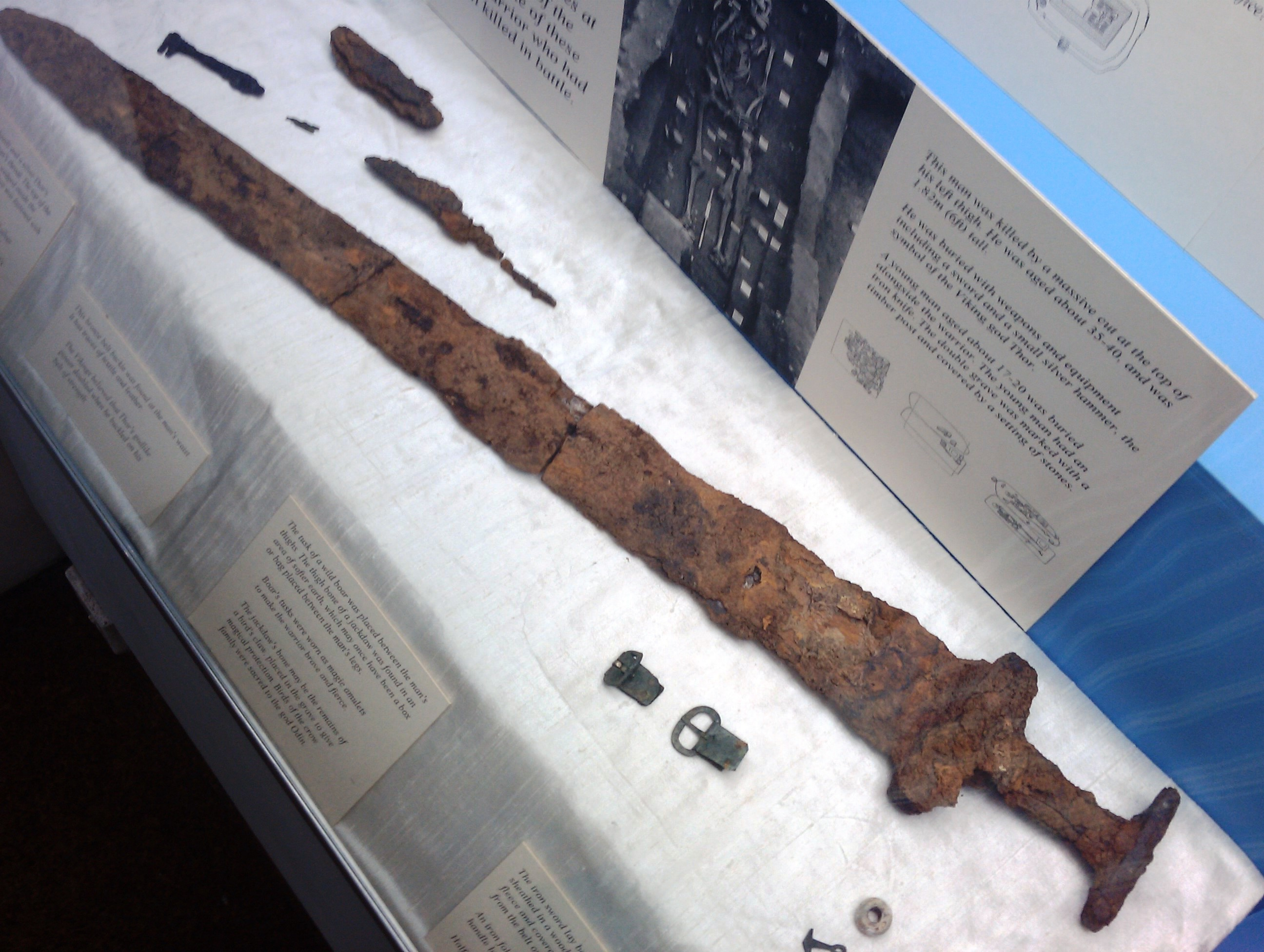
A sword of a Viking buried at Repton in Mercia. This sword is now in Derby Museum.

In late 878, Guthrum's band withdrew to Cirencester, in the kingdom of Mercia. Then, probably in late 879, it moved to East Anglia, where Guthrum, who was also known by his baptismal name of Aethelstan, reigned as king until his death in 890. The part of the army that did not go with Guthrum mostly went on to more settled lives in Northumbria and York. Some may have settled in Mercia. Evidence for this is the presence of two Viking cemeteries in Derbyshire that are believed to be connected to the Great Army, at Repton and at Heath Wood.

In 878, a third Viking army gathered on Fulham by the Thames. It seems they were partly discouraged by the defeat of Guthrum but also Alfred's success against the Vikings coincided with a period of renewed weakness in Francia. The Frankish emperor, Charles the Bald, died in 877 and his son shortly after, precipitating a period of political instability of which the Vikings were quick to take advantage. The assembled Viking army on the Thames departed in 879 to begin new campaigns on the continent.

In 892, the army that had encamped on Fulham, now comprising 250 ships, had returned and re-established itself in Appledore, Kent. Another army of 80 ships soon afterwards also encamped in Milton Regis, posing a threat to the West Saxons. The army subsequently launched a series of attacks on Wessex. Due in part to the King's efforts to resist the invaders and defend Wessex, the Heathen Army made less of an impact against the kingdom than hoped and saw little progress, eventually disbanding in 896.

Throughout the 880s, the Viking presence in his kingdom encouraged Alfred to protect Wessex. The King realised the importance of naval combat against the Vikings and saw to the creation of a navy; Alfred ordered the construction of specialised ships that were supposedly twice as long as Viking ships, some possessing 60 oars, others possessing even more. Alfred also reorganised the army and set up a powerful system of fortified towns known as burhs.

Alfred mainly used old Roman cities for his burhs, as he was able to rebuild and reinforce their existing fortifications. Every freeman in the land could be called out to protect the realm in times of trouble but the speed of Viking hit-and-run raids had been too quick for the local militias to act; part of Alfred's reforms was to create a standing army that could react rapidly to attacks. The Anglo-Saxon rural population lived within a 24 km (15-mile) radius of each burh, so they were able to seek refuge when necessary. To maintain the burhs, as well as the standing army, Alfred set up a system of taxation and conscription that is recorded in a document now known as the Burghal Hidage. The burhs were connected with a network of military roads, known as herepaths, enabling Alfred's troops to move swiftly to engage the enemy. As here was usually a reference to an invading army, then it follows that herepath was a road for use against a here.

Some historians believe that each burh would have had a mounted force ready for action against the Vikings. Based on figures from the Burghal Hidage, it is probable that a fifth of the adult male population of Wessex (27,000 men) would have been mobilised. A common Viking tactic was to seize a centre, usually some sort of fortification, that they could reinforce and then use as a base to plunder the surrounding district. From 884 Alfred's reforms prevented them from doing this in Wessex.

By 896, the Viking army was all but defeated and no longer saw any reason to continue their attacks and dispersed to East Anglia and Northumbria. Those that were penniless found themselves ships and went south across the sea to the Seine. Anglo-Saxon England had been torn apart by the invading Great Heathen Army and the Vikings had control of northern and eastern England, while Alfred and his successors had defended their kingdom and remained in control of Wessex.

== Archaeological sites ==
The stone church of St Wystan at Repton was, in the 9th century, the site of an Anglo-Saxon monastery and church. Excavations at the site between 1974 and 1988 found a D-shaped earthwork on the river bank, incorporated into the church. Burials of Viking type were made at the east end of the church, and an existing building was cut down and converted into the chamber of a burial mound that revealed the disarticulated remains of at least 249 people, with their long bones pointing towards the centre of the burial. A large stone coffin was found in the middle of the mass grave, but the remains of this body did not survive. A study of the skeletal remains revealed that at least 80% of the bodies were male, and were between the ages of 15 and 45. A variety of Viking artefacts were also found among the bones.

Although initial radiocarbon dating suggested that the bodies had accumulated there over several centuries, in February 2018 a team from the University of Bristol announced that the remains could all be dated to the late 9th century, consistent with the time the army wintered in Derbyshire. They attributed the initial discrepancies to the high consumption of seafood by the Vikings. Because the carbon in the Earth's oceans is older than much of the carbon found by organisms on land, radiocarbon dating must be adjusted. This is called the marine reservoir effect.

The nearby Heath Wood barrow cemetery contains about sixty cremations (rather than burials). Finds of cremation sites in the British Isles are very rare, and this one was probably also associated with the Great Heathen Army.

== See also ==
- Uí Ímair, dynasty believed by some historians to be the descendants of Ivar the Boneless
- Raven banner
- The Ballad of the White Horse
- Medieval invasions of Britain

== Sources ==
- Abels, R (1998). Alfred the Great: War. Kingship, and Culture in Anglo-Saxon England. Oxford: Routledge. ISBN 978-0-582-04047-2.
- Æthelweard (1858). Giles Tr., J.A (ed.). Six Old English Chronicles: Æthelweard's Chronicle. London: Henry G. Bohn.
- Asser (1983). "Life of King Alfred". In Keynes, Simon; Lapidge, Michael (eds.). Alfred the Great: Asser's Life of King Alfred & Other Contemporary Sources. Penguin Classics. ISBN 978-0-14-044409-4.
- Brøndsted, Johannes; Skov, Kalle (1965). The Vikings. London: Pelican Books.
- Biddle, M; Kjølbye-Biddle, B (1992). Carver, Martin (ed.). "Repton and the Vikings". Antiquity. 66 (250). York: Antiquity Trust: 36–51. doi:10.1017/S0003598X00081023. S2CID 162929840.
- Forte, Angelo; Oram, Richard D; Pedersen, Frederik (2005). Viking Empires. Cambridge: Cambridge University Press. ISBN 978-0-5218-29922.
- Frantzen, Allen J (2012). Anglo-Saxon Keywords. Wiley. ISBN 978-1-118-25560-5.
- Friis-Jensen, Karsten (2006). Mortensen, Lars Boje (ed.). In the Presence of the Dead. Saint Canute the Duke in Saxo Grammaticus's Gesta Danorum. The Making of Christian Myths in the Periphery of Latin Christendom (c. 1000–1300). Copenhagen: Museum Tusculanum Press. ISBN 978-8-7635-0407-2.
- Gardiner, Juliet, ed. (2000). The Penguin Dictionary of British History (New Ed). London: Penguin Books. ISBN 978-0-1405-1473-5.
- Hadley, Dawn; et al. (2016). "The Winter Camp of the Viking Great Army, AD 872–3, Torksey, Lincolnshire" (PDF). Antiquaries Journal. 96: 23–67. doi:10.1017/S0003581516000718. S2CID 132613900.
- Halsall, Guy (2003). Warfare and Society in the Barbarian West 450–900. London: Routledge. ISBN 978-0-41523-940-0.
- Heath, Ian (1985). The Vikings. Oxford: Osprey Publishing. ISBN 978-0-8504-5565-6.
- Hjardar, Kim; Vike, Vegard (2001). Vikings at war. Oslo: Spartacus. ISBN 978-82-430-0475-7.
- Holman, Elizabeth (2009). The A to Z of the Vikings. Plymouth, England: Scarecrow Press. ISBN 978-0-8108-6813-7.
- Hooper, Nicholas; Bennett, Matthew (1996). "The Vikings in the Ninth Century". The Cambridge Illustrated Atlas of Warfare The Middle Ages, 768–1487. Cambridge: Cambridge University Press. ISBN 978-05214-4049-3.
- Horspool, David (2006). Why Alfred Burned the Cakes. London: Profile Books. ISBN 978-1-86197-786-1.
- Jones, Gwyn (1984). A History of the Vikings. Oxford: Oxford University Press. ISBN 978-0-19-215882-6.
- Kane, Njord (2019). History of the Vikings and Norse Culture. Spangenhelm Publishing. ISBN 978-1-943066-29-2.
- Kirby, D.P. (2000). The Earliest English Kings. London: Routledge. ISBN 978-0-415-24211-0.
- Klæsøe, Iben Skibsted, ed. (2012). Viking Trade and Settlement in Western Europe. Copenhagen: Museum Tusculanum Press. ISBN 978-87-635-0531-4.
- Lavelle, Ryan (2003). Fortifications in Wessex c. 800-1066. Oxford: Osprey. ISBN 978-1-84176-639-3.
- Munch, Peter Andreas (1926). Norse Mythology: Legends of Gods and Heroes. New York: The American-Scandinavian foundation.
- Nelson, Janet L., ed. (1991). The Annals of St-.Bertin (Ninth-Century Histories, Vol. 1 (Manchester Medieval Sources Series): Annals of St-.Bertin vol. 1. Manchester: Manchester University Press. ISBN 978-0-719-03426-8.
- Oliver, Neil (2012). Vikings. A History. London: Weidenfeld & Nicolson. ISBN 978-0-297-86787-6.
- Reuter, Timothy (2003). Alfred the Great: Papers from the Eleventh-Centenary Conferences (Studies in Early Medieval Britain). Aldershot, Hampshire: Ashgate Publishing. ISBN 978-0-7546-0957-5.
- Ridyard, Susan J. (1988). The Royal Saints of Anglo-Saxon England: a Study of West Saxon & East Anglian Cults. Cambridge: Cambridge University Press. ISBN 978-0-521-30772-7.
- Sawyer, Peter (1962). The Age of the Vikings. London: Edward Arnold.
- Sawyer, Peter (2001). The Oxford Illustrated History of the Vikings (3rd ed.). Oxford: OUP. ISBN 978-0-19-285434-6.
- Sawyer, Peter (1989). Kings and Vikings: Scandinavia and Europe, A.D. 700–1100. London: Routledge. ISBN 978-0-415-04590-2.
- Smyth, Alfred P. (2002). The Medieval Life of King Alfred the Great: A Translation and Commentary on the Text Attributed to Asser. Basingstoke, Hampshire: Paulgrave Houndmills. ISBN 978-0-333-69917-1.
- Smyth, Alfred P. (1995). King Alfred the Great. Oxford: Oxford University Press. ISBN 0-19-822989-5.
- Starkey, David (2004). The Monarchy of England Volume I. London: Chatto & Windus. ISBN 978-0-7011-7678-5.
- Stenton, F. M. (1971). Anglo-Saxon England (3rd ed.). Oxford: OUP. ISBN 978-0-19-280139-5.
- Sturdy, David (1996). Alfred the Great. London: Constable. ISBN 0-09-476570-7.
- Vikinges Kibs Museet. "The five Viking ships – The Skuldelev Ships". Vikinges Kibs Museet. Archived from the original on 28 August 2021.
- Welch, Martin (1992). Anglo-Saxon England. London: English Heritage. ISBN 978-0-7134-6566-2.
