= Foremark Reservoir =

Reservoir in South Derbyshire, England

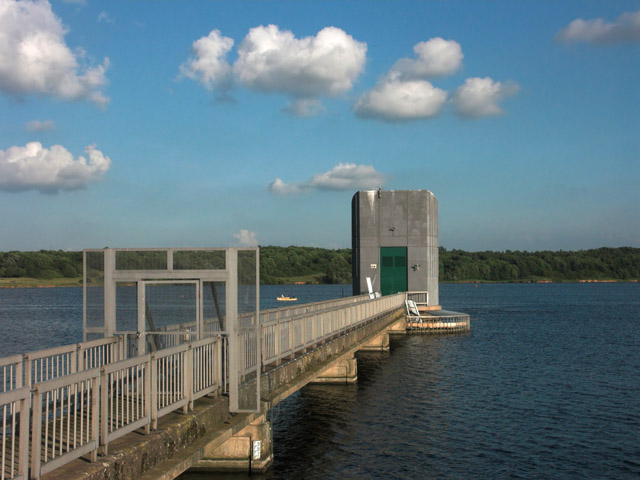
- The outfall.

- Location within Derbyshire
- Location: South Derbyshire
- Coordinates: 52.814°N 1.51°W
- Type: reservoir
- Primary inflows: River Dove
- Primary outflows: Melbourne water treatment works
- Basin countries: United Kingdom
- Surface area: 230 acres (93 ha)
- Water volume: 2,900 million gallons (13,200 mega litres)

Foremark Reservoir (OS grid reference SK3324) is a reservoir in South Derbyshire owned by Severn Trent which is also a 230-acre (0.93 km^{2}) nature reserve open to the public for walking, fishing, bird watching and horse riding. Severn Trent are working together with the National Trust at Foremark. It is also the base for Burton Sailing Club. The reservoirs source of water is from the River Dove at Egginton, and it was constructed in the 1970s. The reservoir is accessible from the road between Milton and Ticknall. It is north of Ashby-de-la-Zouch and close to Ingleby, Swadlincote and Willington. It is part of the National Forest. Admission is free, but there is a charge for the use of the car park.

== Wildlife ==
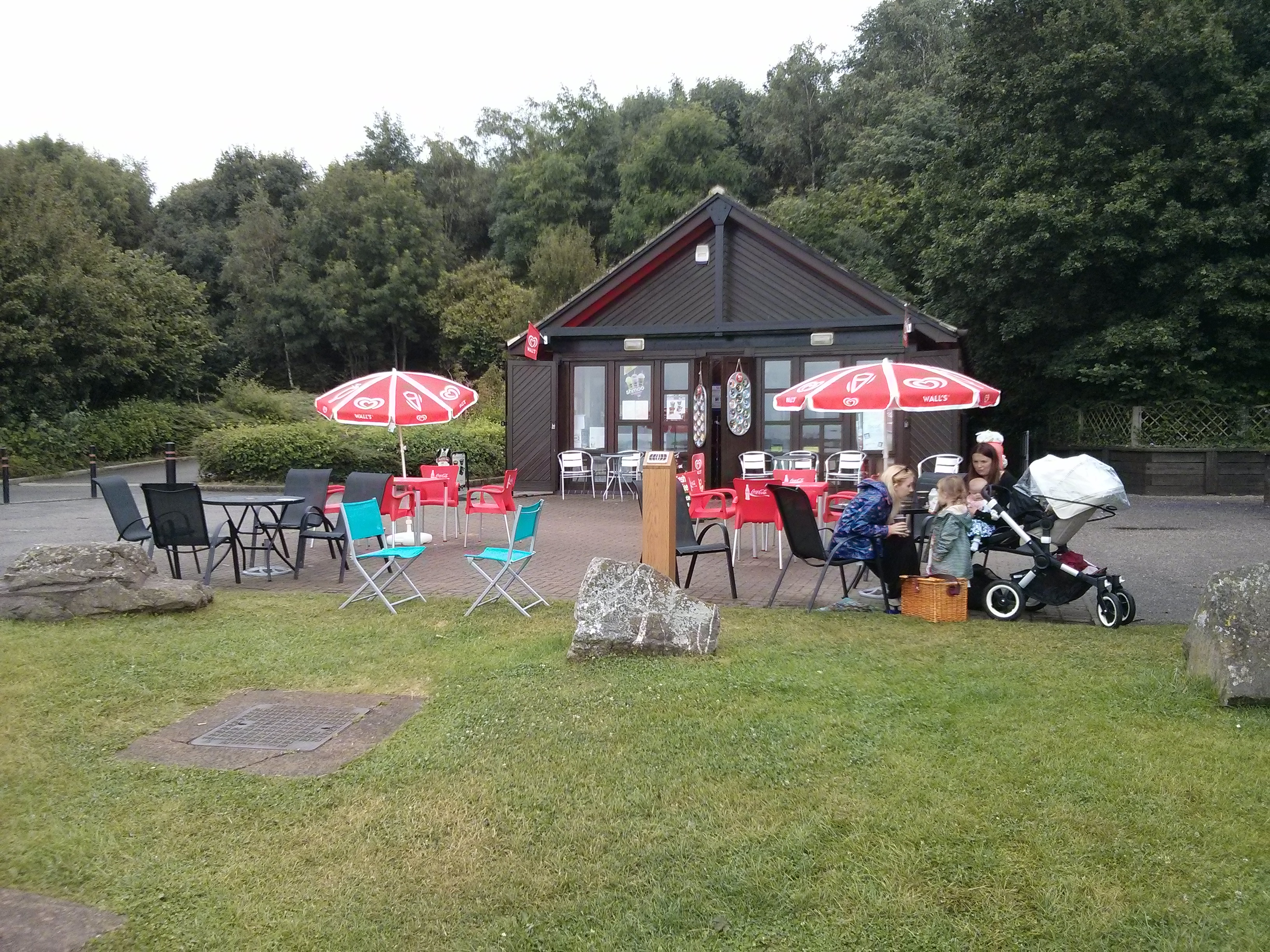
The cafe.

Twenty-seven varieties of butterfly have been recorded on the reserve, including the large skipper, the speckled wood, white-letter hairstreak, small copper, holly blue and the brown argus. The reservoir is stocked with trout and is available for angling between the end of March and the middle of December. One reason for the plentiful fish might be the large abundance of aquatic invertebrates – including dragonfly larvae, water boatman, great diving beetles (and larvae), pond skaters, water scorpions and silver diving beetles.
