= Hugh Patrick Guarin Maule =

Hugh Patrick Guarin Maule DSO MC FRIBA
- Major H.P.G. Maule DSO MC FRIBA
- Born: 12 May 1873; Newnham on Severn, Gloucestershire
- Died: 15 May 1940 (aged 67); Hertfordshire
- Education: Bedford Modern School
- Occupation: Architect
- Known for: Architect of the Royal Veterinary College in London

Hugh Patrick Guarin Maule DSO MC FRIBA (12 May 1873 – 15 May 1940) was a British architect whose work included the Royal Veterinary College in London opened by George VI in 1937. Between 1919 and 1923 he was Chief Architect to the Ministry of Agriculture and Fisheries and also served as architect to the trustees of the Douglas Haig Memorial Homes for Ex-Soldiers.

== Early life ==
Henry Patrick Guarin Maule was born on 12 May 1873 at Newnham on Severn in Gloucestershire. He was the son of Augustus Henry Maule and Ellen Maule. Maule was educated at Bedford Modern School, where he was head boy, and later articled to the architectural practice of Colonel Sir Robert William Edis KBE CB.

== Career ==
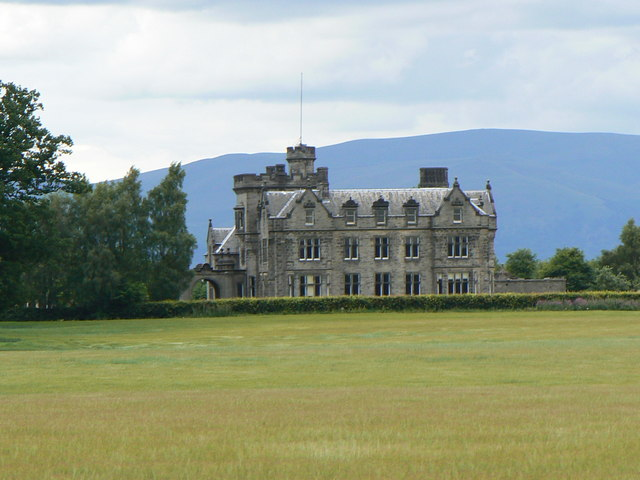
Kinnaird House where Maule made large additions and alterations in 1928

After a spell in private practice Maule was made Headmaster of the London Architectural Association School of Architecture, a position he held from 1903 to 1913. During World War I, Maule became a Major in the Honourable Artillery Company, was a recipient of the Military Cross and made a Companion of the Distinguished Service Order.

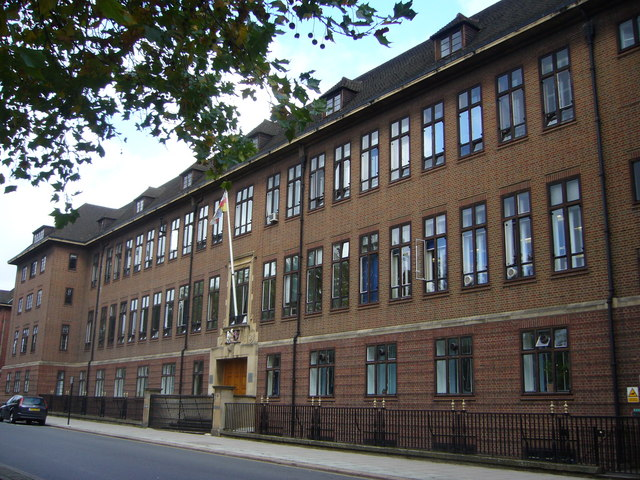
Royal Veterinary College, Camden, London, 1937

After the war, Maule was made Chief Architect to the Ministry of Agriculture and Fisheries but returned to private practice in 1923. He was architect to the trustees of the Douglas Haig Memorial Homes for Ex-Soldiers. For much of his architectural career Maule was based in London operating in partnership with William Adam Forsyth as Forsyth & Maule.

Mould's work included large additions and alterations to Kinnaird House in Perthshire and the Royal Veterinary College in London which was opened by King George VI in 1937.

== Family life ==
In 1902, he married Edith Poole, eldest daughter of Canon R.B. Poole DD, the headmaster of his old school. He died in Hertfordshire on 15 May 1940, ages 67, and was survived by his wife, two sons and a daughter.

Two days after his obituary, a tribute to Major Maule was published in The Times on 18 May 1940: 'In everything he did he was actuated by the highest principles; and by his fine ideals, energy and keenness he inspired others. He was a true leader of men'.
