= History of the English penny (c. 600 – 1066) =

Coin in Anglo-Saxon England

The history of the English penny can be traced back to the Anglo-Saxon kingdoms of the 7th century: to the small, thick silver coins known to contemporaries as pæningas or denarii, though now often referred to as sceattas by numismatists. Broader, thinner pennies inscribed with the name of the king were introduced to Southern England in the middle of the 8th century. Coins of this format remained the foundation of the English currency until the 14th century.

== Overview ==
The history of Anglo-Saxon coinage spans more than five centuries, from the end of Roman rule in Britain in the 5th century, down to the death of Harold Godwinson at the Battle of Hastings on 14 October 1066. It can be divided into four basic phases:

- c. 450 – c. 550: a very low level of coin-use in Britain, characterised by re-use of Roman coinage, though often in a non-monetary context. A small number of coins continued to be brought in from Gaul and elsewhere on the Continent.
- c. 550 – c. 680: the 'gold' phase of currency, which began with an increase in the rate of importation of continental gold, principally in the form of tremisses. From around 620 English gold coins of similar format were produced, often known to numismatists as thrymsas. By the middle of the 7th century, the quantity of gold in these coins was falling quickly, such that by the 670s they were more or less completely silver.
- c. 680 – c. 750 (867 in Northumbria): the age of the sceattas – small, thick silver coins which evolved out of the latest, debased gold coins. These should more correctly be referred to as pennies or denarii as in weight and fineness they approximated the form the English penny was to retain for centuries, and contemporary references suggest this is how they were known. Most sceattas do not bear an inscription and are thus difficult to attribute. In Northumbria, coins of this format continued to be struck under closer royal control until the 860s, though by the early 9th century they contained only a negligible quantity of precious metal.
- c. 750 – 14 October 1066: the silver coinage of sceattas petered out in Southumbrian England in the middle of the 8th century, to be replaced by a broader, thinner model of silver coinage modelled on that of contemporary Carolingian coinage. These new coins carried legends naming the king, moneyer and (later) the mint of origin. With various modifications in weight (within the range 1.00g – 1.70g) and fineness this format of coinage remained standard for the rest of the period, and indeed silver pennies of similar design remained the basis for the English currency until the 14th century. Pennies of this form were made by English kings from Offa onwards, and also by Viking rulers from the later 9th century.

In the gold phase of the coinage, the currency consisted overwhelmingly of gold tremisses or thrymsas of c. 1.10 – 1.30g, though a few solidi exist, modelled on Roman coins. Thereafter the currency was more or less based on a single denomination: the silver penny. In the early 870s the first round halfpennies were produced under Alfred the Great and Ceolwulf II of Mercia; these were produced sporadically and in small quantity until Edgar's reform of the 970s, after which it became common to cut whole pennies into halves and quarters, often at the time of production. The only known examples of larger silver denominations are two 'offering pieces' produced in the reign of Alfred the Great weighing the equivalent of six regular pennies, which were made as alms-pieces, probably to be sent abroad.

Although gold ceased to be the predominant form of currency in the 7th century, from the late 8th century onwards there was some use of fine gold coinage for special, high-value transactions. These gold pieces were often known as mancuses. The form of gold coinage varied in the 8th and 9th centuries, drawing inspiration from Roman, Byzantine, Arabic and Carolingian gold coinages, but by the 10th century gold coins were made simply by striking a gold piece with the same dies as were used for regular minting of silver. Only eight English gold coins with intelligible legends survive from between the 8th century and 1066; there are also some coins that may or may not be of English origin which bear no legend, and specimens of contemporary foreign gold found in England.

It is difficult to ascertain the nature and extent of coin-use in Anglo-Saxon England. Written references to minting and money are scarce, and it is likely that even a single silver penny had considerable buying power – perhaps something in the region of £10–£30 in modern currency. Their use may also have been concentrated in certain classes of society, and was probably most associated with particular transactions such as the payment of rents, tributes and legal fees. However, analysis of surviving single-finds (principally made since the 1970s by users of metal-detectors) shows that coins were used extensively, especially in the eastern half of England, both within and outside towns; they also circulated widely, and are frequently found far from their mint of origin. Substantial numbers of English coins have been found elsewhere in Europe, especially in Italy and Scandinavia, while English designs were influential on the emergent coinages of Ireland, Denmark, Sweden, Norway and Bohemia.

== After Rome: prelude to the Anglo-Saxon coinage ==
At the end of the 4th century, the Roman provinces of Britain were still part of a vibrant and quite efficient economic and monetary system that stretched over the whole Roman world. Precious metal coins of gold and silver were used for the payment of taxes, then reminted for payment to the military and civil service. Bronze coinage was issued on a more occasional basis and was primarily produced to serve the needs of commerce in the provinces. Minting – and control over precious metals in general – across the western empire was under the control of the Comes sacrarum largitionum, with a number of major mints situated at Trier, Arles, Milan, Ravenna and Rome. London had operated as a mint in the first half of the 4th century, and again for a brief period under Magnus Maximus, but by 400 inflows of coinage to Britain came from the continent.

Finds of coins are very numerous from throughout the 4th century and even from the first years of the fifth. However, in the early 5th century the situation took a dramatic turn for the worse. The supply of bronze coinage all but ceased after around 402, and both gold and silver also petered out by c. 410, coinciding with the departure of the British garrison with Constantine III in 409. Hoards of coins and bullion – especially silver – from this period are very numerous in Britain, presumably due to disturbances of invasion, civil war and economic uncertainty. Some of these hoards could be very substantial: the Hoxne hoard from Norfolk discovered in 1992 contained over 15,000 coins along with silver plate and jewellery.

The cessation in supply of freshly struck coins didn't necessarily cause an immediate halt in the use of coinage. Numismatists and archaeologists have long been struck by the phenomenon of clipped siliquae from the early 5th century, though precise dates and explanations for it remain elusive. Clipping may have carried on into the middle of the 5th century, or been restricted to the 410s and 420s, and was perhaps carried out as a means of taxation by a government deprived of new supplies of coinage. According to this model, siliquae of a specified weight would have been brought in, clipped, and finally reissued by unit rather than weight.

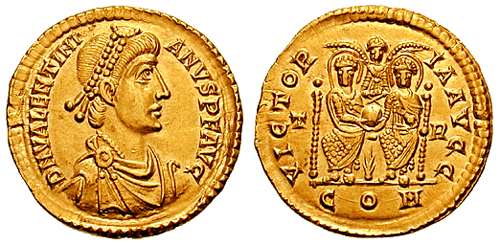

First side of the image: O: Bust of Valentinian II right. DN VALENTINIANVS IVN PF AVG
Second side of the image: R: Two enthroned emperors holding globe, with victory above and mintmark below. VICTOR-IA AVGG TROBT
Gold solidus of Valentinian II, Trier, 375-92. Found in Anglo-Saxon grave at Droxford, Hampshire.

The later 5th and 6th centuries are very murky in almost every way, and coinage is no exception. The once vigorous late Roman monetary system lay in tatters, with almost no new minting and very little importation of new coins. Nevertheless, it is becoming apparent that coinage never faded away completely, and that re-use of the existing supply of coinage continued throughout the period, buoyed along by occasional incomers. Some archaeological excavations of Romano-British settlements that persisted into this period have produced older coins that remained in circulation, as at Wroxeter. Gold and bronze coins in particular are often found on early Anglo-Saxon settlement sites and in graves, in many cases pierced or mounted for use as Jewellery. Indeed, there is no telling exactly when any late Roman coin was lost, and in some cases they may have been in use well into the post-Roman period. As for new imports, the number known for this period has increased considerably in recent years thanks to the spread of metal-detecting. Hoards from this period are rare, but two have been found in recent years at Oxborough (2001) and Patching (1997), both dating to the later 5th century and the latter including no fewer than fifty gold and silver coins dating from the period up to c. 470. A scattering of single-finds from the same period shows that the flow of coinage into 5th- and 6th-century Britain never dried up totally, and it appears that there was also some use of Byzantine coinage in the 6th century: gold and especially bronze coins have been found in substantial numbers, even in the western part of Britain, which is normally less well represented in coin finds. This to some extent parallels the pattern of finds of North African pottery from the same period, which is found extensively in western Britain on 6th-century sites. Unfortunately, the widespread use of Byzantine bronzes from this period as souvenirs from the Middle East and eastern Mediterranean means many finds of them must be treated with extreme care. The importation of current continental issues – mainly in gold – continued over the 6th century, with considerable numbers of Merovingian tremisses circulating in southern and eastern England even by the end of the 6th century. It was on the basis of these coins that the first native English production of coins took place in the early 7th century.

== The earliest gold coinage: thrymsas ==
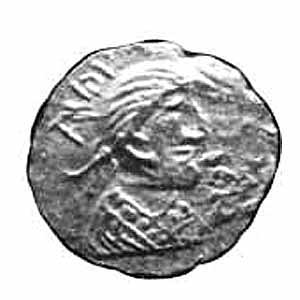
O: Bust of Eadbald right. AVDV[ARLD REGES]

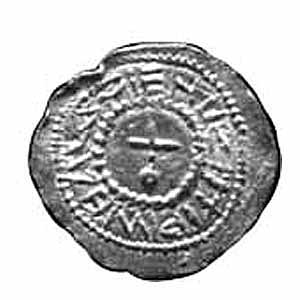
R: Cross on globe within wreath. ++IÞNNBALLOIENVZI

Gold thrymsa of Eadbald of Kent, London (?), 616-40.

The earliest known English coins are gold pieces, modelled on contemporary Merovingian Frankish coinage, and consisting largely of tremisses: one third of a gold solidus, originally weighing 4.5g, but in the Anglo-Saxon context apparently based on a revised standard of 3.9g implemented in Gaul from around the 580s. Frankish coins played an increasingly important role as currency in England as the 6th century went on, and the earliest Anglo-Saxon gold tremisses (sometimes referred to by numismatists as thrymsas) were struck to circulate alongside these Frankish issues: all of the forty gold tremisses found in the burial at 'mound one' at Sutton Hoo (deposited c. 630), for instance, were Frankish. The earliest coins struck in England can be roughly dated to around the year 600: they include one gold tremissis struck by a moneyer named Eusebius working at Canterbury (Dorovernia), and the Liudhard medalet, a gold medallion (though in fabric very like a coin) found in Canterbury and bearing the name of a bishop Liudhard, almost certainly the same bishop of that name whom Bede's Historia ecclesiastica described as coming to England with Bertha, the Frankish bride of Æthelberht I of Kent.

The only substantial hoard of English coins from this period was found at Crondall, and included 69 English tremisses as well as a number of Frankish tremisses, probably deposited around 630. These and other finds reveal a range of types that rarely name a mint or issuing authority, though one scarce type bears the name of London, and others are struck in the name of King Eadbald of Kent (616–40). In terms of design they are based on Roman and Merovingian prototypes.

Widespread use of metal detectors in the last thirty years has substantially increased the number of coins known from this and indeed all periods. For all that the coins are still relatively rare and minting was primarily confined to the south-east, some were probably struck in Northumbria, presumably at York, and both English and Frankish gold coins circulated widely. The arrangements behind minting are also quite obscure, and it cannot automatically be assumed that they were produced as a 'royal' coinage: bishops, abbots, lay magnates and perhaps individual moneyers may have provided the driving force behind minting.

Though the early Anglo-Saxon law-codes must be used with caution for this period, they describe a wide range of compensatory payments in scillingas and scættas from c. 600 onwards. These terms reflect translations of continental legal usage, and may well describe measures of value and/or weight rather than coins as such, yet nonetheless it is probable that the gold tremisses produced in 7th-century England were referred to as scillingas.

== The silver boom of c. 675 – c. 750: the sceattas ==
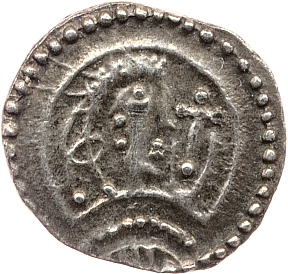
O: Diademed bust right, with cross in front.

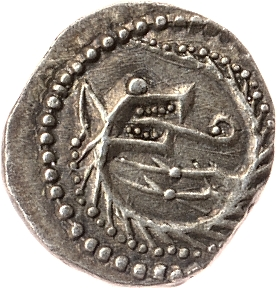
R: Coiled wolf with curled tongue facing right.

Silver sceat of series K, London (?), c. 710–20.

Over the course of the 7th century, the gold content of Anglo-Saxon and Frankish tremisses deteriorated until, in the 660s, they were often only 10-20% pure. Around this point, there was a major shift from debased gold to silver in Merovingian Frankia. However, within a few years of c. 675 very large silver coinages were being struck in southeastern England as well. A few issues, such as those inscribed with the runic name Pada and the Latin Vanimundus, exist in both debased gold and silver, presumably spanning the changeover. The new silver coins are similar to the later tremisses in terms of size and weight: small (typically 10-12mm in diameter), thick and usually weighing 1–1.3g. Because of the references in the law-codes mentioned above, these new silver pieces have been known to numismatists as sceattas since the 17th century. Contemporary terminology is uncertain, though it is likely that these coins were known as peningas (pennies), just like their later broader equivalents. Silver pennies of roughly this weight (1–1.6g) were to remain the sole unit of English currency until the 13th century, with the exception of rare silver halfpennies and even rarer gold coins.

The first ('primary') sceattas of series A, B and C were largely confined to Kent and the Thames Estuary, though the emergence of the 'secondary' sceattas (probably c. 710) introduced a breathtaking array of new designs and saw minting expand to many new areas: by the middle of the 'secondary' phase coins were being struck in Kent, the Thames Estuary, East Anglia, eastern Mercia, Northumbria and Wessex. Unfortunately, because very few coins bear any form of legend and there was extensive imitation and copying, it is extremely difficult to assign dates and minting-places to many of the types and series identified by modern scholars. These are arranged into lettered series according to the scheme of Stuart Rigold, devised in the 1960s and 70s, and sometimes by the numbers applied to types in the British Museum catalogues of the 1880s and expanded thereafter to around 150 different varieties. The current chronology, basically laid down by Mark Blackburn in the mid-1980s, rests on the large Cimiez hoard from southern Gaul, which contained sceattas of several secondary types alongside local issues of named rulers that allowed the hoard to be dated c. 715/20.

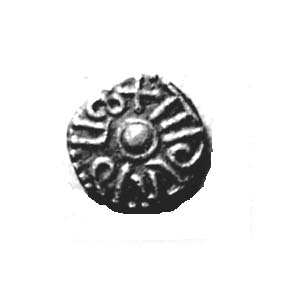
O: +ALDFRIDVS around central annulet.

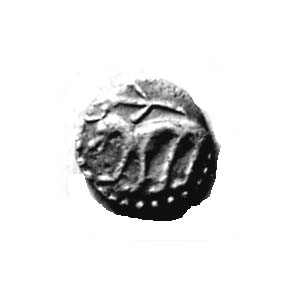
R: Left-facing quadruped.

Silver sceat of Aldfrith of Northumbria, 685-704.

There remains much uncertainty about the organisation behind the sceattas and exactly what authorities lay behind minting. Some issues are so large that only major rulers could have been behind them, whilst others are so small that they could well have been the work of an individual moneyer working independently. Others display prominent and sophisticated religious motifs, suggesting that they may have been produced by monasteries or bishops. An exception to the general obscurity of the sceattas comes in Northumbria, where from a very early date the king and (arch)bishop of York played a strong role in coinage production: King Aldfrith was the first English king named on silver coinage anywhere, and his successors retained a relatively tight hold on coinage after production resumed under Eadberht.

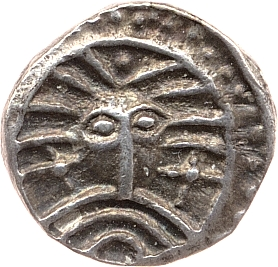
O: Facing bust with beard and cross on either side.

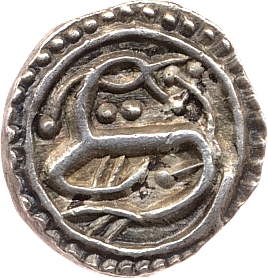
R: Right-facing curled 'dragon'.

Silver sceat of series X, Ribe, Denmark, c. 710–20.

The early 8th century saw coinage production and circulation on a very impressive scale; greater indeed than at any other point after the 4th and before the 13th century. Some 2,500 finds of sceattas are recorded from England, particularly the east and the south, allowing study on the finer details of circulation and use. Sceattas were also produced and used in the Netherlands and probably Jutland. Minting places in the Low Countries such as Dorestad and Domburg supplied a significant proportion of the currency circulating in England at any one time, and were among the most important commercial centres in Europe. Sceattas provide invaluable evidence for the vigour with which trade across the North Sea was conducted in the early 8th century.

== The introduction of the broad penny: Offa and his contemporaries ==
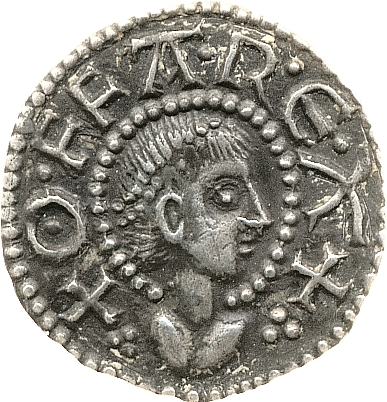
O: Diademed bust of Offa right. +OFFA REX+

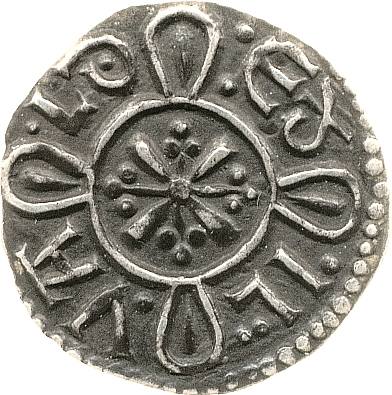
R: Lobed cross on large annulet containing smaller cross superimposed on saltire. EðILVALD.

'Light' silver penny of Offa, moneyer Æthelweald, London, c. 775–92.

By the middle of the 8th century, production of sceattas had, as with the thrymsas before them, declined considerably: the last coins of the secondary period are scarce and often debased, and a dearth of coinage is indicated in the record of several archaeological and metal-detecting sites that had been productive for the previous period. Similar problems afflicted the Frankish kingdom too, and around 754/5 King Pippin III (751–68) took the initiative and reformed the Frankish coinage, introducing a new, thinner, broader format (at least 15mm in diameter) struck in much finer silver. Importantly, these new coins all bore the king's name and (usually) the name of the issuing mint. English rulers followed suit around the same time, and the earliest signs of reform outside Northumbria (where a substantial and relatively high quality silver coinage remained in production, albeit sporadically, over the 8th century) came in East Anglia, where the obscure ruler Beonna reformed the local coinage sometime after he came to the throne in 749. His coins bear the royal name and that of the moneyer, and in fabric are midway between the sceattas and the new Frankish pennies. Initially struck in fine silver, Beonna's coinage later declined in standard, though one of his moneyers survived to strike some of the earliest coins known for Offa of Mercia.

O: Draped bust of Æthelberht right. LUL+EDILBERHT

R: Pelleted frame containing wolf and twins. REX

Silver penny of Æthelberht, moneyer Lul, East Anglia, c. 779–94.

It was Offa who introduced the broad penny to southumbrian England on a substantial scale, and made the employment of king's and moneyer's names standard at least three mints: Canterbury, London and somewhere in East Anglia. His earliest coins bear an abbreviated version of the royal title influenced by that on the coinage of Pippin III, and on the reverse the moneyer's name. Early in the course of his coinage (probably in the 760s or 770s) there were also smaller issues at Canterbury in the names of two local Kentish kings, Heaberht (of whom only one coin survives) and Ecgberht II. Production of broad silver pennies also persisted in East Anglia, commencing in Offa's name but later interrupted by a small coinage struck in the name of King Æthelberht II of East Anglia, who was executed by Offa in 794: only three specimens of his coinage survive today, probably produced in the 780s or 90s.

Offa's coinage represents one of the high-points of Anglo-Saxon art, and indeed they were probably the most artistically accomplished coins produced anywhere in Europe at that time: they stand in sharp contrast with the aniconic coins of contemporary Frankia. Portraits were introduced at an early stage, and were executed in a number of different styles betraying a range of artistic influences drawing on contemporary and Roman sources. Reverse designs included intricate crosses of various types, but the range of Offa's die-cutters encompassed other reverse designs including intertwining serpents, eels and the wolf and twins. Uniquely in Anglo-Saxon England, coins were also struck at Canterbury in the name of the queen, Cynethryth, from dies produced by the same talented individual responsible for the best of Offa's portrait dies. This practice could have been inspired by encounters with Roman coins in the names of empresses. It is also possible, though less likely, that the appearance of Irene on Byzantine coinage led Offa's queen to place her image on coins as well. Certainly Cynethryth emerges from surviving evidence as a formidable individual, who regularly witnessed contemporary charters immediately after her husband, was responsible for the running of his household and survived him to become a powerful abbess.

As with the sceattas considerable problems surround knowledge of exactly how the new coinage was organised and implemented. It is possible that the pennies of Offa's reign still reflect the vestiges of the organisation behind the complex sceattas, with the diverse designs often varying from moneyer to moneyer. Other authorities exerted minting rights in his reign that may have been held for some time: the Bishop of London (Eadberht) is named on some coins, the only pennies struck in the name of an Anglo-Saxon bishop outside York and Canterbury; and in Canterbury the archbishops Iænberht (765–92) and Æthelheard (793–805) struck both independently and with Offa. Similarly, dating the reforms that brought this new penny coinage into being is contentious. It appears likely that production started at roughly the same time at London, Canterbury and East Anglia, perhaps c. 765–70, and the bulk of the coinage – including the portrait coinage – was probably produced in the 770s and 80s. Later in Offa's reign there was a second reform in which the weight was raised, the size of the flan increased and a common non-portrait design introduced at all three mints. This 'heavy coinage' can be closely dated, for no examples of it are known in the name of Archbishop Iænberht, whilst there are no 'light' (i.e., pre-reform) pennies of Archbishop Æthelheard, indicating that the reform took place in 792 or 3.

The coins of Offa provide valuable evidence for a new dimension of royal authority and action with regard to the coinage, and have received much attention from historians because of their impressive imagery and range of royal titulature: Offa is variously entitled REX, REX M(erciorum), REX MERCIORU(m) and probably REX A(nglorum).

== The 9th century ==
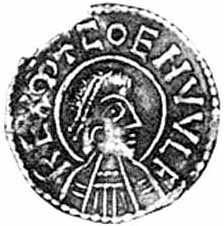
O: Draped and diademed bust of Coenwulf right. REX M+COENVVLF

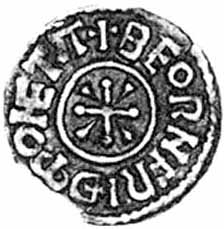
R: Cross with wedges in angles. +BEORNFRIĐ MONETA

Silver 'Cross-and-wedges' penny of Coenwulf, moneyer Beornferth, Canterbury, 805 – c. 810.

After Offa's death in 796, usurpers in Kent and East Anglia – Eadbearht Præn and Eadwald – took power and issued coins in their own names, following the design of Offa' heavy coinage. After a small issue at London based on this same type, the new Mercian ruler Coenwulf instituted a reform of the coinage leading to the new tribrach type. This non-portrait type used an obverse design modelled on the earlier coinage of Cynethryth, and despite its use of the central M (for Merciorum) was adopted by Eadbearht, Eadwald and even by Beorhtric of Wessex, who struck a very rare coinage around this time.

By 798 Coenwulf had regained Kent and East Anglia also came back under his power by the 9th century. He appointed a sub-ruler for Kent – his brother Cuthred – in whose name coins were struck at Canterbury. Cuthred and his brother may have minted simultaneously in the cross-and-wedges portrait type current from around 805, but it is equally possible that they had sole control of the mint one after the other.

Around the same time, the archiepiscopal coinage at Canterbury also changed: the new archbishop, Wulfred, was very eager to assert his ecclesiastical rights, even at the expense of the king, and instituted an archiepiscopal portrait coinage bearing no reference at all to Coenwulf. This attractive series was modelled on the silver denarii produced by Pope Hadrian I (772–95).

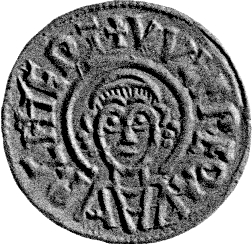
O: Facing tonsured bust of Wulfred. +VVLFRED ARCHIEPI

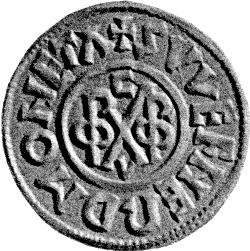
R: Monogram of DOROVERNIA. +SVVEFHERD MONETA

Silver penny of Wulfred, moneyer Swefherd, Canterbury, c. 815–22.

Coenwulf continued a portrait coinage for the rest of his reign at Canterbury, London, East Anglia and, from c. 810, at a new mint located at Rochester in Kent. Canterbury came to dominate silver coin production, and whilst East Anglia and Rochester remained relatively stable, pennies from London become very rare: despite the recent discovery of a gold coin of Coenwulf with the legend DE VICO LVNDONIAE it is clear that the mint of London was in decline by around 800.

In the years between Coenwulf's death in 821 and Egbert of Wessex's conquest of Kent and the south-east in 825, the mint at Canterbury weathered a turbulent period that is better reflected in the coins than any written source. Coenwulf's brother and successor Ceolwulf I held Kent, but coins in his name from Canterbury are very rare and struck by only a few of the full complement of moneyers. Nonetheless, his short reign provides evidence of quite strong interest in the coinage, and several types common to a number of mints were introduced: a feature not seen in the latter part of his predecessor's reign. The largest of these new types even encompassed the normally distinct East Anglian mint. Rochester became far more productive under Ceolwulf, perhaps to compensate for lower royal production at Canterbury. It looks like the greater part of Canterbury's coinage from the years c. 822–24 consists of 'anonymous' pennies bearing a royal- or archiepiscopal-style portrait surrounded by the moneyer's name and the mint name (Dorobernia civitas) on the reverse. No reference is made to any king or archbishop. This fascinating coinage seems to reflect a time when the moneyers were uncertain of whose authority to recognise, probably around Ceolwulf's deposition in 823 by Beornwulf. No Kentish coins are known in his name, but there are many in the name of one Baldred, who was probably another Mercian sub-ruler of Kent, though this is difficult to tell for certain from the very scanty written records of this period. However, it is known that when Egbert of Wessex and his son Æthelwulf invaded Kent in 825 they put Baldred to flight and imposed their own rule.

Egbert's campaign of conquest took him far beyond Kent and even through Mercia to the borders of Northumbria in 829–30. Unusually, this dramatic military success was reflected in an issue of coinage from London, with Egbert named REX M(erciorum). This is one of very few cases in Anglo-Saxon England where it looks like coinage was being used in a propagandistic way: design and production was not as closely tied to politics and current events as in the classical or modern period.

After these conquests Egbert retreated and consolidated his position in the south-east, leaving Mercia to Wiglaf, who struck a very rare coinage at London, now the only mint available to the kings of Mercia. Egbert's coinage from Kent at first continued the pattern of Baldred's, but was reformed c. 828 to introduce a new reverse monogram type, retaining a portrait of the king on the obverse. Archiepiscopal minting was interrupted immediately after the West Saxon takeover, but resumed shortly before Wulfred's death using the same monogram reverse as the royal coinage in conjunction with an archiepiscopal name and bust on the obverse; a type that continued under Wulfred's successor Ceolnoth, who came to power in 833.

The 9th century saw the spread of minting beyond the south-east, which had dominated production outside Northumbria since the end of the sceattas. The West Saxon mint initiated by Beorhtric continued to operate at a relatively low level under Egbert but remained very sporadic in operation between his death and Alfred's reign later in the 9th century. In East Anglia, coinage gradually became more substantial under the last Mercian rulers and, from c. 825, under a series of independent rulers: Æthelstan, Æthelweard and (St) Edmund. These kings mainly issued non-portrait pennies bearing a large central A, and other designs which were often particular to individual moneyers, though produced by a common die-cutter. When first adopted under Coenwulf, this central A probably represented part of an Alpha-Omega pair, but in East Anglia more likely signified Angli or (rex) Anglorum.

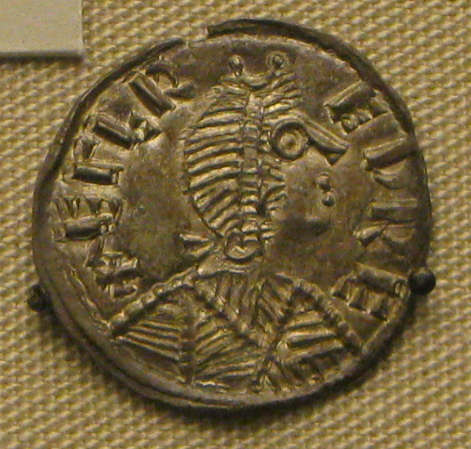
Silver coin of Alfred the Great, King of Wessex from 871 to 899.

Under Æthelwulf, minting remained buoyant at Canterbury and Rochester and continued in the name of Archbishop Ceolnoth throughout the period. A succession of four phases can be distinguished at these two mints. At Canterbury the first was a non-portrait coinage bearing the legend REX SAXONIORVM, inspired by Egbert's West Saxon coinage; and a new portrait coinage bearing a wide range of reverse designs came second. At Rochester, the first type comprised a portrait element with diverse reverse designs struck by the royal moneyers, and also a probably episcopal element which does not name a moneyer or carry a portrait, but does bear the unusually long royal title REX OCCIDENTALIVM SAXONVM. In the second phase the episcopal coinage ceases and a non-portrait type was adopted by the royal moneyers. The last two phases of Æthelwulf's coinage were common to both Rochester and Canterbury, with dies for both mints in the final phase coming from a common source at Canterbury. The third type of Æthelwulf's reign was a non-portrait coinage with the ambiguous mint legend DORIBI (which could refer to either Canterbury, Dorobernia; or Rochester, Dorobrebia) and a monogram for CANT(ia).

Æthelwulf's last coinage was a new portrait type of very different style. This inscribed cross type may have only come into production after several years without coinage at Canterbury: just two moneyers from there and from Rochester survived from earlier types, possibly because of the Viking raid on Kent recorded in 851. This new coinage survived into the reign of Æthelwulf's son Æthelberht (no genuine coins are known of Æthelbald, who ruled 858–60) under whom it became very substantial: about forty moneyers are known to have produced it. Another new portrait type, the short-lived floreate cross type, also appeared at the end of his reign but survives in very small numbers today. Since the inscribed cross type is known largely thanks to a large hoard discovered at Dorking in the early 19th century and is found only rarely otherwise, it may be that the floreate cross coinage too was once much more substantial than its modern survival rate appears to indicate. The inscribed cross coinage is notable for the onset of major debasement, the centralisation of die-cutting for Canterbury and Rochester, and for a massive increase in the number of moneyers, so that almost 50 are known from the time of Æthelberht. These changes probably reflect the onset of a new and more intense royal management of the coinage, which was to be expanded under Æthelberht's successors.

=== Mercia ===
In the reign of Berhtwulf of Mercia (c. 840–52) minting at London, Mercia's only remaining mint, began again in earnest, around the time of Æthelwulf's second phase of coinage in the mid 840s. A mixture of portrait and non-portrait types was struck. Because of the long abeyance of the London mint, considerable support came from West Saxon Rochester in the form of dies and even moneyers, and it is possible that some coins in Berhtwulf's name were actually produced in Rochester. It was once thought that this monetary co-operation was reflected in a unique penny bearing the name of Æthelwulf on one face and that of Berhtwulf on the other. However, this coin more likely represents an unofficial production without any particular political significance.

The recovery of Mercian minting was made most manifest by the adoption in Wessex of the 'lunettes' type first struck at London by Berhtwulf's successor Burgred. This coinage survives in very large numbers thanks to a great increase in minting, especially in the latter part of Burgred's reign: about twenty moneyers are known for Alfred and 35–40 for Burgred. This period is particularly well known thanks to the discovery of a large number of hoards, presumably associated with Viking raids. This coinage is very difficult to organise or categorise in any meaningful way. However, the lunettes type had become very debased by the early 870s when production was probably at its highest, and another reform was initiated in the mid 870s by Alfred ('the Great') of Wessex. This introduced the heavier, finer cross-and-lozenge type after a number of very rare and interesting experimental issues were struck in the years around the reform. At London, which lay within the Mercian kingdom, Alfred was initially recognised as king of Mercia as well as Wessex after the deposition of Burgred in 873/4, and was even called REX ANG(lorum) on one of two known examples of the two emperors portrait penny type. The other specimen of this fascinating type is in the name of Ceolwulf II, the new Mercian king installed by the Vikings. Ceolwulf also struck pennies of the cross and type, and the earliest known round English halfpenny belongs to this phase of coinage.

Further reforms were initiated by Alfred later in his reign. Around 880, London struck an innovative series of portrait pennies bearing Alfred's portrait and, on the reverse, a Monogram of Lundonia. Later one moneyer, Tilewine, placed his name on the reverse as well, but this coinage was for the most part struck without moneyers' names. The main type struck in the latter part of Alfred's reign, however, was the non-portrait two line type. Again, a few different and perhaps experimental types have survived in small numbers. These include a portrait coin – probably from around the same time as the London monogram pennies – with the mint-name ÆT GLEAPA ('from Gloucester'), which had become an important centre of 'English' Mercia under Alfred's ealdorman Æthelred; a small number of 'four-line' non-portrait pennies with reverse mint names assigning their production to Winchester and Exeter; another non-portrait series probably struck at Oxford (OHSNAFORDA); and large silver 'offering pieces' inscribed ELIMOSINA ('alms').

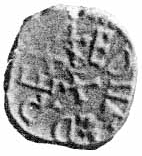
O: +EDILRED REX around central cross.

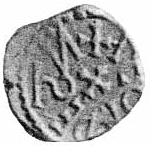
R: +LEOFDEGN around central cross.

Copper styca of Æthelred II of Northumbria, moneyer Leofthegn, c. 840–48.

=== Northumbria ===
Northumbria's numismatic history was quite distinct from that of the south. Coinage never petered out as completely as it did below the Humber, and until close to the end of its history Northumbrian coinage remained closely linked to the king and archbishop. However, debasement became a serious issue around the end of the 8th century, when numismatists begin to apply the term stycas to Northumbrian coinage (based on a 10th-century gloss in the Lindisfarne Gospels; contemporary terminology is unknown). Both the political and the numismatic chronology of this period is very confused, with many accounts and suggestions competing with one another. By the middle of the 9th century, Northumbrian coinage contained almost no silver and was being produced on a massive scale.

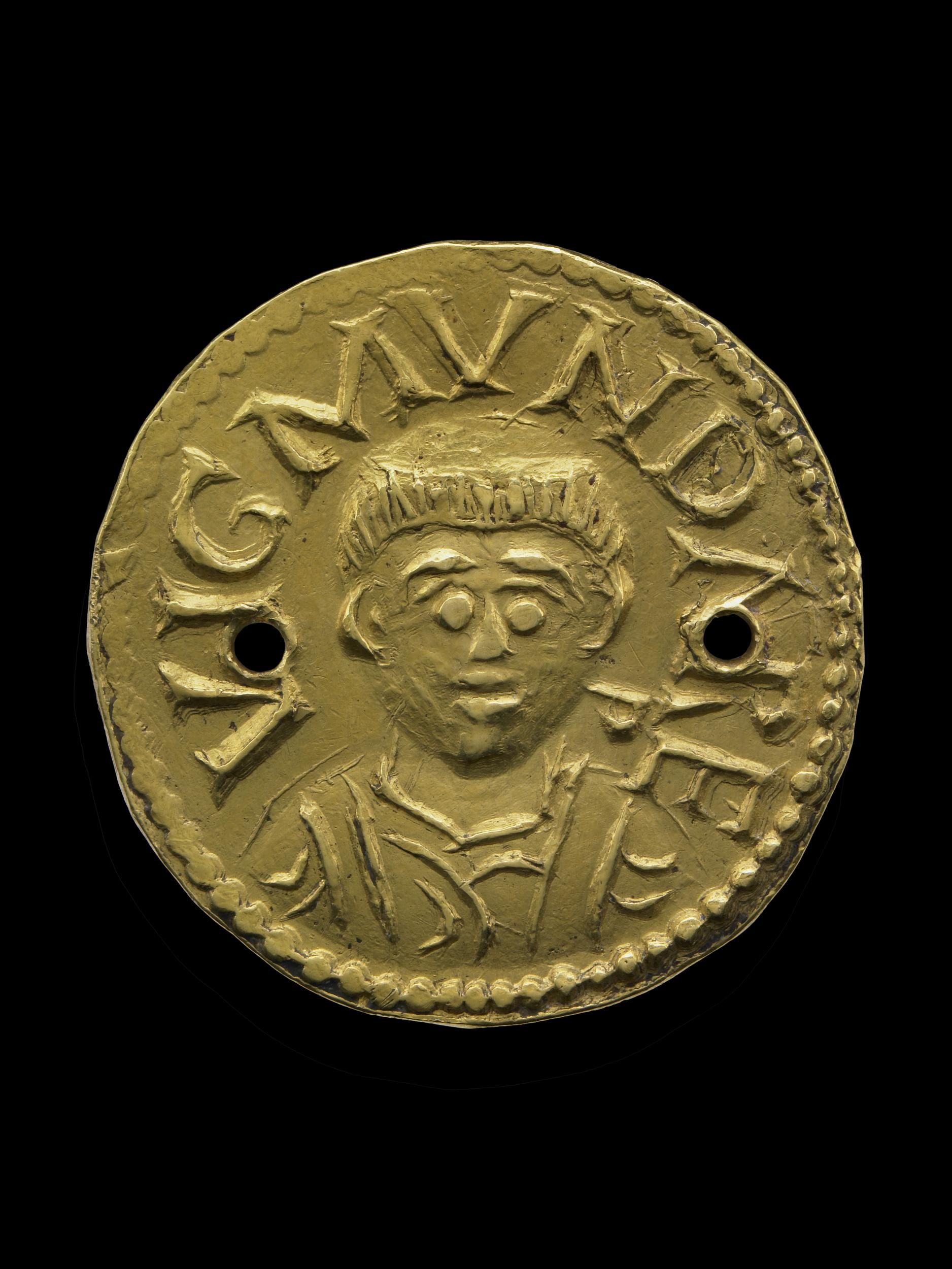
Wigmund solidus

Many tens of thousands of coins are known today, and several very large hoards have been found, such as one from the churchyard in Hexham which contained some 8000 stycas. After a final phase of considerable disorganisation, the stycas were phased out by the Scandinavian rulers who took over Northumbria in 867, and replaced with a new penny coinage on the model of coinage in the Carolingian empire and southumbrian England. Two exceptional coins illustrate that Northumbrian coinage in the 9th century may not have been entirely composed of stycas: a gold Mancus survives in the name of Archbishop Wigmund, modelled on contemporary gold solidi of Louis the Pious; and a silver penny found in the Cornish Trewhiddle hoard of c. 868 in the name of EANRED REX, with an anomalous reverse legend apparently reading ĐES MONETA ('his coin'(?)) followed by an Omega. The latter coin has still not been conclusively fitted into context: its style suggests production around 850, but Eanred of Northumbria probably died in 840. It may therefore be either a posthumous commemorative issue of some sort, or a survivor of a very rare Southumbrian coinage in the name of an otherwise forgotten ruler.

The styca coinage was studied extensively by Elizabeth Pirie who produced an "indispensable corpus of known finds" in her work Coins of the Kingdom of Northumbria.

== Viking coinages ==
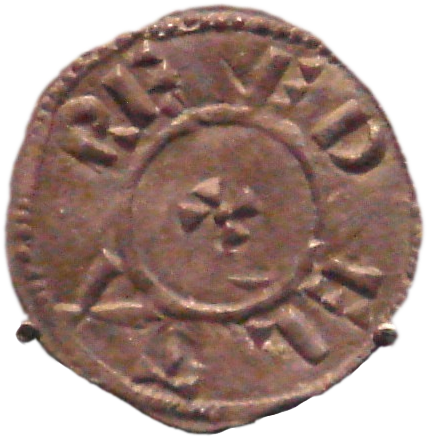
Coin of Guthrum (Athelstan II), Viking king of East Anglia, 880

Viking settlers in England found themselves in a more sophisticated coin-using economy than they were accustomed to at home; consequently it is unsurprising that the first coins that can be associated with the Vikings in England are imitations of Alfred's coinage, particularly the 'London monogram' and 'two-line' types. These are very numerous today, and for a long time caused great difficulty for numismatists working on Alfred's coinage, who could not always tell them from the genuine issues. However, before the end of the 9th century new silver coinages had begun in East Anglia and at York. In East Anglia, a coinage was struck in imitation of Alfred's in the name of Guthrum (with his baptismal name Æthelstan), followed by a very large coinage naming the martyred Saint Edmund on the obverse, which was struck by at least sixty moneyers (the bulk of them bearing names indicating continental origins). This coinage persisted until the conquest of East Anglia by Edward the Elder in 917/18. In Northumbria, the highly debased styca coinage came to an end and was replaced with a fine silver coinage, which is very well known thanks to the huge (c. 8,000 coin) Cuerdale hoard deposited in the first decade of the 10th century.

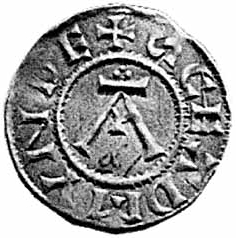
O: Large A within circle. +SCE EADMVND RI

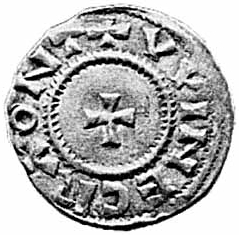
R: Circle containing small central cross. +VVINE CRAONT

Silver penny of St Edmund Memorial Coinage, moneyer Wine, East Anglia, c. 895–910.

Sometimes this coinage named local Viking rulers (the identification of whom with figures from written sources is often impossible or contentious) but, at the start of the 10th century, the name of the mint and that of Saint Peter replaced references to king and moneyer. From the 910s the York coinage resumed naming the ruler and also began to display a range of interesting devices connected to the Scandinavian presence in York: swords, hammers, banners and a bird variously interpreted as a raven or dove. The York pennies of Anlaf/Olaf Guthfrithson (939–41) present the first known use of Old Norse in the Latin alphabet anywhere in the legend ANLAF CVNVNGIR ('King Anlaf').

Although Northumbria and East Anglia were the main bastions of Viking coinage, at various times there was also production in the East Midlands, for instance of coins naming Saint Martin at Lincoln.

== The 10th century ==
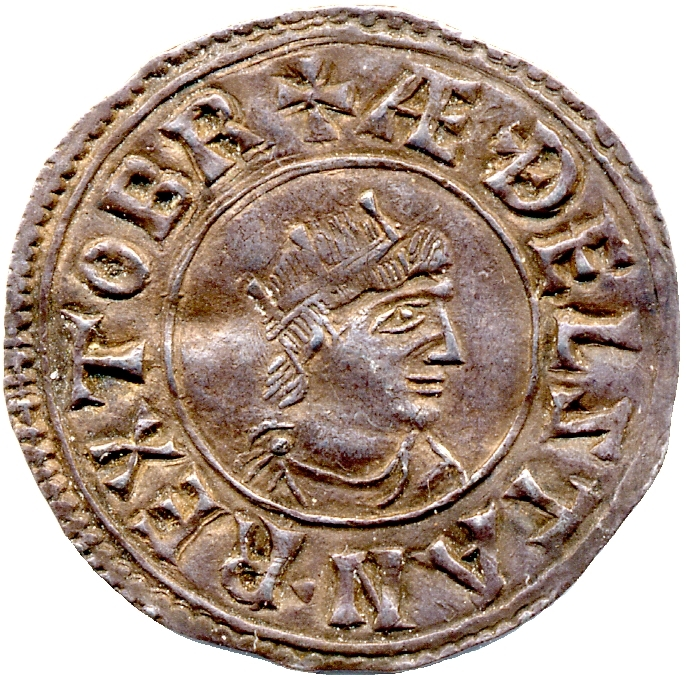
O: Crowned right-facing bust of Athelstan. +ÆĐELSTAN REX TO BR

Silver 'Bust crowned' penny of Athelstan, moneyer Otic, Winchester, c. 927–39.

The coinage of Edward the Elder in some ways continued the types and organisation current under his father Alfred in Wessex and English Mercia, but with the expansion of West Saxon control into the Midlands and East Anglia the currency system became more complex as new regions were incorporated into Edward's kingdom. For the most part the coinage was non-portrait and simple in design, though some mints in English Mercia struck an interesting series of pictorial reverse types. Since mint names are again very rare, attributions must largely be made by working backwards from Æthelstan's reign when mint names were often found on coins of the circumscription cross and bust crowned types. These coinages, struck at about thirty named mints after the conquest of the kingdom of York in 927, reflect a renewed effort on the king's part to have a single, centrally controlled coinage spanning the kingdom: types were standardised, the royal title was expanded from the usual REX to REX SAXONUM or even REX TO(tius) BRIT(anniae), as one finds in contemporary charters. It was also under Æthelstan that coinage was first mentioned in any detail in legal documentation: a law-code issued by him at Grateley (probably around 926-30 though incorporating numismatic data from somewhat earlier) details the acceptance of a single currency and penalties for forgery, and goes on to list a series of minting places and the number of moneyers permitted to each.

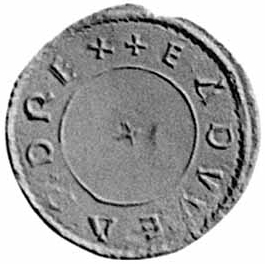
O: Circle containing small central cross. +EADVVEARD REX

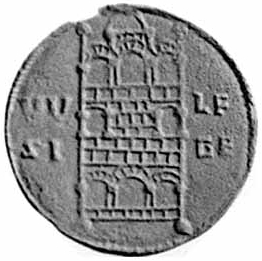
R: City gate. +VVLFSIGE

Silver penny of Edward the Elder, moneyer Wulfsige, 899-924.

Towards the end of Æthelstan's reign and in the time of his successors Edmund, Eadred, Eadwig and the first part of Edgar's reign, the coinage was of a regionalised character, with up to seven regions of monetary circulation. The structure of this system is clearest for northern England thanks to the discovery of more numerous hoards in that part of the country. Coins normally stayed within their area of production, and different types were current in each region. However, these regions were not static, and many of the 'regional' types were, to the untrained eye, comparatively similar. The predominant type bore the king's name in circumscription on the obverse (normally around a small cross), and the moneyer's name in two lines with various ornaments on the reverse. At various times a circumscription reverse was also used, which gave scope for a longer legend; or a portrait obverse. For reasons unknown, East Anglia in particular favoured royal portraits between the 930s and 970s, though it was also used sporadically elsewhere. Mints are not normally named, but it is usually possible to attribute coins to their region of origin. However, despite the regionalised types and circulation of coinage, pennies remained of relatively stable size, weight and fineness, and most importantly were always struck in the name of the West Saxon king. Even when the kingdom was divided between Eadwig and Edgar in 957, coinage seems to have remained the preserve of Eadwig, the senior partner in rule, even in the mint towns ruled by Edgar.

The last phase of this regionalised coinage, struck in the first decade of Edgar's sole reign, produced a number of unusual features. Mint names became more common, and there were a number of appropriations from earlier English coinage, such as a resurrection of Alfred's London monogram on halfpennies and Æthelstan's royal title REX TO(tius) BRIT(anniae). This revival of interest in the coinage foreshadowed an even greater reform at the end of Edgar's reign.

== Edgar's reform, c. 973 and the late Anglo-Saxon coinage ==
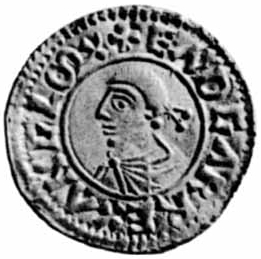
O: Draped and diademed bust of Edgar left within circle. +EADGAR REX ANGLOR[um]

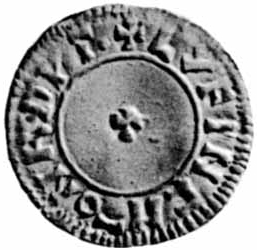
R: Small cross within circle. +LYFING MO NRĐPI

Silver 'Reform' penny of Edgar, moneyer Lyfing, Norwich, c. 973–75.

Exactly when Edgar reformed the coinage is not certain: that it was towards the end of his reign is clear from the coins, and the only help provided by written sources is a reference in Roger of Wendover's 13th-century chronicle, which implies the reform may have taken place in or after 973. Its impact, however, cannot be underestimated, and it formed the basis of the English coinage until the reign of Henry II. Old coins disappeared from circulation and a single standardised type was introduced at around forty mints across the country, bearing the royal portrait and title on the obverse and the names of moneyer and mint around a small central cross on the reverse. Initially, too, all new dies were distributed from a single die-cutting centre located at Winchester. Such centralisation was unusual, and occurred in only a few of the other types that came after: more commonly, the same type was used throughout the country but die production devolved to a number of regional die-cutting centres which distributed dies to nearby, smaller mints. Even within the nine-month reign of Harold II in 1066 coins were struck with a new design in his name at forty-eight mints. Around seventy places in England (and in Wales under the Normans) were active as mints during this period, ranging hugely in size and productivity: the largest was London, though York and Lincoln remained important throughout the period, and other major mints included Winchester, Norwich and Stamford. At the other end of the scale are places that were never important mints in the Anglo-Saxon period and are little more than villages, hillforts and market towns today, including Melton Mowbray, Milborne Port, Castle Gotha, Cadbury Castle and Dunwich. Mints of this kind were often only active during short periods, such as a number of 'emergency' mints set up during the reign of Æthelred II because of Viking depredations.

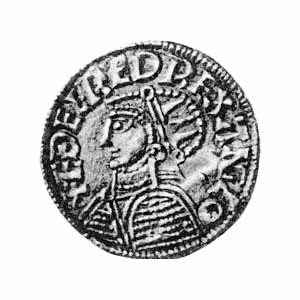
O: Helmeted bust of Æthelred right. +ÆĐELRED REX ANGLOR

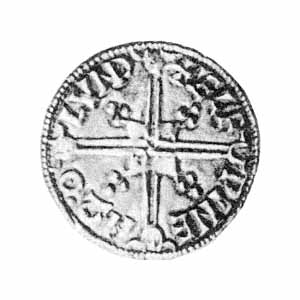
R: Long cross with central lozenge with beaded finials. +ELFǷINE MO LVND

Silver 'Helmet' penny of Æthelred II, moneyer Ælfwine, London, c. 1003–09.

The designs chosen for the coinage were relatively uniform, following the pattern of Edgar's reformed pennies: the obverse carried some form of royal portrait as well as the royal name and title, whilst the reverse gave the name of the moneyer and the mint around some form of cross. Within this format, however, there was much variation. Portraits could face either way and reflect a wide range of influences. Under Æthelred II, for instance, one type was based upon early 4th-century Roman coins showing the emperor in military garb, with helmet and armour; another was based on civilian portraits of other 4th-century emperors without any form of headgear. Under Edward the Confessor there was strong German influence in the portraits from the last fifteen years or so of his reign, perhaps as a result of Edward's employment of German goldsmiths named Theoderic and Otto. These show the king bearded, helmeted and crowned, and in some cases even facing straight forward or seated on a throne.

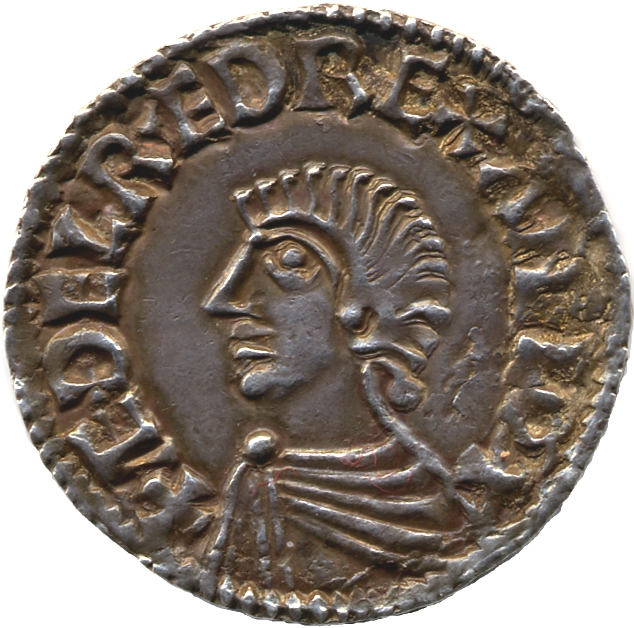
O: Draped bust of Æthelred left. +ÆĐELRED REX ANGLOR

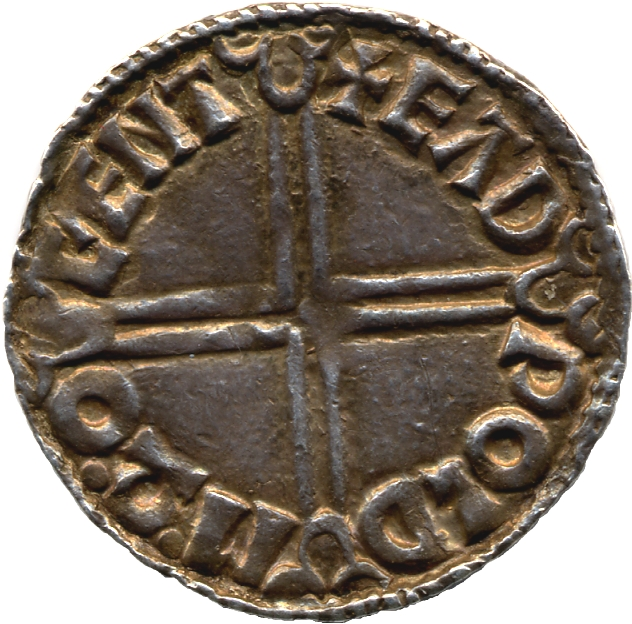
R: Long cross. +EADǷOLD MO CÆNT

Silver 'Long Cross' penny of Æthelred II, moneyer Eadwold, Canterbury, c. 997–1003.

The existence of moneyer and mint names on each and every coin provide valuable evidence for the study of not only mint structure (in terms of how productive certain moneyers were, or how many shared dies) but also of contemporary naming patterns and – to some extent – the makeup of the population. Mints located in the old Danelaw, like York and Lincoln, contained a preponderance of moneyers with Scandinavian names, whilst one sometimes comes across moneyers all over the country with continental names, or even more exotic names in Old Irish.

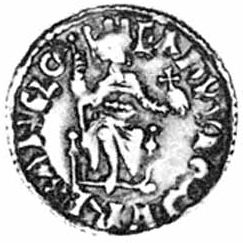
O: King seated facing on throne holding orb and sceptre. EADVVEARDV REX ANGLO

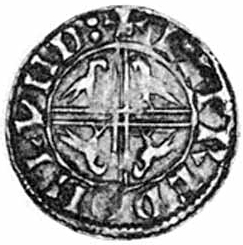
R: Circle containing cross with birds in angles. +ÆLFRED ON LVND

Silver 'Sovereign eagles' penny of Edward the Confessor, moneyer Ælfwine, London, c. 1050–60.

This first type, usually known as the First small cross or Reform type, remained in currency for Edgar's last years, the whole of Edward the Martyr's short reign and even into the first years of Æthelred II, who came to the throne in 978/9. At some point early in his reign, however, another of the features that was to characterise the late Anglo-Saxon currency system came into play: the first of many changes of type. More than fifty such changes occurred during the existence of the coinage as reformed by Edgar, which persisted until the 1150s. Within the reign of Æthelred, for instance, six such changes can be seen, manifested in the progression of the following types: First Small cross; First hand; Second hand; Crux; Long Cross; Helmet; Last Small cross. After the death of Cnut, under whom another three types (Quatrefoil, Helmet and Short cross) were struck, types become more numerous and changes presumably more frequent: fourteen types were struck in the years between 1035 and the Norman Conquest of 1066, probably lasting only two or three years each. It is presumed that each change of type required coins of old money to be exchanged for new, with the king and the moneyer taking a cut either as a portion of the value of the new coins or from the minting process. The weight of the coinage varied considerably, even within types, suggesting that there may have been some profit taken in minting by extracting silver from the coinage, though within the kingdom of England it would have been possible to enforce that all coins be accepted at face value regardless of weight. Hoard evidence, at least from before the 1030s, suggests that reminting of the whole coinage was stipulated at each change of type, for a number of hoards survive consisting of only one type. Alongside these, however, are 'savings' hoards, which contain a mixture of two or more types; and a mixture of types becomes much more common in hoards from after the 1030s. One possible explanation for this change in the pattern of production and hoarding is that it came to be the rule, after the 1030s, that only payments to the crown had to be in the current type, whereas other types of English coinage were viable for other purposes.

Remarkably little written evidence survives to help numismatists and historians understand how the coinage and its system of changes of type actually functioned. Domesday Book does record that moneyers at certain mints had to go to London to purchase new dies for twenty shillings quando moneta vertebatur ('when the coinage was changed'), and that certain towns paid annual sums to the king for the privilege of running a mint. At several towns bishops and abbots had rights to the profits of one or more moneyers (which normally went to the king), but these are no longer reflected by any changes in the design of the coins. Numismatists have sometimes tried to discern a very rigid system of organisation in the late Anglo-Saxon coinage: one, Michael Dolley, believed that until the death of Cnut in 1035, each type lasted six years, with a few exceptions – such as the Last Small Cross type at the end of Æthelred's reign – lasting longer under very unusual conditions. Some features seem to support this belief, at least for the earlier period. Certain changes of type apparently coincided with datable historic events: no coins of the Helmet type survive from the mint of Wilton, for instance, whereas no coins of the preceding Long Cross type are known from nearby Salisbury, but moneyers with the same names as those from Wilton started to operate there in the Helmet type. The Anglo-Saxon Chronicle records that in 1003 Wilton was sacked by Vikings and the inhabitants retreated to Salisbury, and it is likely that the change of type coincided with this event. However, there are a number of difficulties with reconstructing such a fixed framework. Not all types are as well represented in the surviving material, and it is clear that this is not always simply a result of a few large hoards distorting our view. There are a number of very small and rare types which were certainly never meant to become fully fledged issues, though some bear a clear relationship to them. Examples from the reign of Æthelred II include the Benediction Hand type and the Intermediate Small Cross type, as well as the famous Agnus Dei type: a unique and fascinating issue on which the king's portrait and the reverse cross are replaced with, respectively, the Lamb of God and the Holy Dove. The exact context for the production of this very rare coinage is unclear (eighteen specimens survive, as of November 2008): it was only struck at smaller mints, mostly in the midlands, either as an abortive main issue or as a special religious coinage for some specific purpose or occasion. Although the dating is unclear, it may be associated with the Eynsham gathering and the Penitential Edict of 1009. But the difficulties with the sexennial theory are not restricted to smaller, rarer types. The Second Hand type of Æthelred, for example, was not much different in appearance from its predecessor, raising the question of how easily people would have told it and the old coinage apart. More importantly, only minuscule numbers of the type survive from more northerly mints such as Lincoln and York which, in the rest of the period, were some of the most productive in the kingdom. It is possible that the Second Hand type represents a continuation of the First Hand type, which may have run on rather longer than six years as part of a mechanism that did envisage changes of type, but not necessarily on a strict sexennial basis.

The late Anglo-Saxon coinage is best understood for the period c. 990 – c. 1030 thanks to the discovery of many tens of thousands of coins in hoards from Scandinavia. Connections between England and Scandinavia were very close at this time, with raiders, traders, mercenaries and, ultimately, kings regularly crossing the North Sea. English coins in Scandinavian hoards probably include at least some profit from raiding and the tributary payments referred to as Danegeld. Payments to Danish troops employed by the English kings continued until 1051, when Edward the Confessor dismissed the last of them. English coin finds in Scandinavia become even fewer after this time. However, since large numbers of roughly contemporary Arabic and, later, German coins have also been found in Scandinavia, it is probable that the bulk of the English imports came via trade rather than military action.

== Bibliography ==
=== General ===
- Dolley, R. H. M., Anglo-Saxon Pennies (London, 1964)
- Grierson, P., and M. A. S. Blackburn, Medieval European Coinage, I: the Early Middle Ages (5th–10th Centuries) (Cambridge, 1986)
- Grierson, P., Numismatics (Oxford, 1975)
- Lyon, C. S. S., 'Historical Problems of Anglo-Saxon Coinage', British Numismatic Journal 36 (1967), 227–42; 37 (1968), 216–38; 38 (1969), 204–22; and 39 (1970), 193–204
- Lyon, C. S. S., 'Some Problems of Interpreting Anglo-Saxon Coinage', Anglo-Saxon England 5 (1976), 173-224
- Stewart, B. H. I. H., 'The English and Norman Mints, c. 600 – 1158', in A New History of the Royal Mint, ed. C. E. Challis (Cambridge, 1992), pp. 1–82
- Williams, G., Early Anglo-Saxon Coins (Colchester, 2008)

=== After Rome ===
- Abdy, R., 'After Patching: Imported and Recycled Coinage in Fifth- and Sixth-Century Britain', in Coinage and History in the North Sea World c. 500 – 1250: Essays in Honour of Marion Archibald, ed. B. Cook and G. Williams (Leiden and Boston, 2006), pp. 75–98
- Guest, P., The Late Roman Gold and Silver Coins from the Hoxne Treasure (London, 2005)
- Kent, J. P. C., 'From Roman Britain to Anglo-Saxon England', in Anglo-Saxon Coins: Studies Presented to F. M. Stenton on the Occasion of His 80th Birthday, 17 May 1960, ed. R. H. M. Dolley (London, 1961), pp. 1–22
- King, C., 'Late Roman Silver Hoards in Britain', British Numismatic Journal 51 (1981), 5–31
- King, M. D., 'Roman Coins from Early Anglo-Saxon Contexts', in Coins and the Archaeologist, ed. J. Casey and R. Reece, 2nd ed. (London, 1988), pp. 224–9
- Moorhead, T. S. N., 'Roman Bronze Coinage in Sub-Roman and Early Anglo-Saxon England', in Coinage and History in the North Sea World c. 500 – 1250: Essays in Honour of Marion Archibald, ed. B. Cook and G. Williams (Leiden and Boston, 2006), pp. 99–109
- Reece, R., The Coinage of Roman Britain (Stroud, 2002)
- White, R. H., Roman and Celtic Objects from Anglo-Saxon Graves, BAR British Series 191 (Oxford, 1988)

=== Thrymsas ===
- Abdy, R., and G. Williams, 'A Catalogue of Hoards and Single-Finds from the British Isles, c. AD 410 – 675', in Coinage and History in the North Sea World, c. 500 – 1250: Essays in Honour of Marion Archibald, ed. B. Cook and G. Williams (Leiden, 2006), pp. 11–73
- Grierson, P., 'La fonction sociale de la monnaie en Angleterre aux VIIe – VIIIe siècles', in Moneta e scambi nell'alto medioevo (Spoleto, 1961), pp. 341–85; repr. in his Dark Age Numismatics (London, 1979), no. XI
- Metcalf, D. M., Thrymsas and Sceattas in the Ashmolean Museum, Oxford, 3 vols. (London, 1993–4), vol. 1
- Stewart, B. H. I. H., 'Anglo-Saxon Gold Coins', in Scripta Nummaria Romana. Essays Presented to Humphrey Sutherland, ed. R. A. Carson and C. M. Kraay (London, 1978), pp. 143–72
- Sutherland, C. H. V., Anglo-Saxon Gold Coinage in the Light of the Crondall Hoard (Oxford, 1948)
- Williams, G., 'The Circulation and Function of Coinage in Conversion-Period England, c. AD 580 – 675', in Coinage and History in the North Sea World, c. 500 – 1250: Essays in Honour of Marion Archibald, ed. B. Cook and G. Williams (Leiden, 2006), pp. 145–92

=== Sceattas ===
- Abramson, T., Sceattas: an Illustrated Guide (Great Dunham, 2006)
- Gannon, A., The Iconography of Early Anglo-Saxon Coinage (Sixth–Eighth Centuries) (Oxford, 2003)
- Hill, D., and D. M. Metcalf, ed., Sceattas in England and on the Continent: the Seventh Oxford Symposium on Coinage and Monetary History (Oxford, 1984)
- Metcalf, D. M., Thrymsas and Sceattas in the Ashmolean Museum, Oxford, 3 vols. (London, 1993–4)
- Metcalf, D. M., 'Monetary Expansion and Recession: Interpreting the Distribution Patterns of Seventh- and Eighth-Century Coins', in Coins and the Archaeologist, ed. J. Casey and R. Reece, 2nd ed. (London, 1988), pp. 230–53
- Rigold, S., 'The Two Primary Series of Sceattas', British Numismatic Journal 30 (1960–1), 6–53
- Rigold, S., 'The Principal Series of English Sceattas', British Numismatic Journal 47 (1977), 21–30

=== The age of Offa ===
- Archibald, M., 'The Coinage of Beonna in the Light of the Middle Harling Hoard', British Numismatic Journal 55 (1986), 10–54
- Archibald, M., 'A Sceat of Ethelbert I of East Anglia and Recent Finds of Coins of Beonna', British Numismatic Journal 65 (1995), 1–19
- Blunt, C. E., 'The Coinage of Offa', in Anglo-Saxon Coins: Studies Presented to F. M. Stenton on the Occasion of His 80th Birthday, 17 May 1960, ed. R. H. M. Dolley (London, 1961), pp. 39–62
- Chick, D., 'Towards a Chronology for Offa's Coinage: an Interim Study', Yorkshire Numismatist 3 (1997), 47–64
- Chick, D., ed. M. Blackburn and R. Naismith, The Coinage of Offa and His Contemporaries (London, 2007)
- Pirie, E. J. E., Coins of the Kingdom of Northumbria, c. 700 – 867, in the Yorkshire Collections (Llanfyllin, 1996)
- Stewart, B. H. I. H., 'The London Mint and the Coinage of Offa', in Anglo-Saxon Monetary History: Essays in Memory of Michael Dolley, ed. M. A. S. Blackburn (Leicester, 1986), pp. 27–43

=== The 9th century ===
- Blackburn, M. A. S., 'Alfred's Coinage Reforms in Context', in Alfred the Great: Papers from the Eleventh-Centenary Conferences, ed. T. Reuter (Aldershot, 2003), pp. 199–217
- Blackburn, M. A. S., and D. N. Dumville, ed., Kings, Currency and Alliances: History and Coinage in Southern England in the Ninth Century (Woodbridge, 1998)
- Blunt, C. E., 'The Coinage of Ecgbeorht, King of Wessex, 802–39', British Numismatic Journal 28 (1955–7), 467–76
- Blunt, C. E., C. S. S. Lyon and B. H. I. H. Stewart, 'The Coinage of Southern England, 796–840', British Numismatic Journal 32 (1963), 1–74
- Dolley, R. H. M., 'The Chronology of the Coins of Alfred the Great', in Anglo-Saxon Coins: Studies Presented to F. M. Stenton on the Occasion of His 80th Birthday, 17 May 1960, ed. R. H. M. Dolley (London, 1961), pp. 77–95
- Dolley, R. H. M., and K. Skaare, 'The Coinage of Æthelwulf, King of the West Saxons', in Anglo-Saxon Coins: Studies Presented to F. M. Stenton on the Occasion of His 80th Birthday, 17 May 1960, ed. R. H. M. Dolley (London, 1961), pp. 63–76
- Lyon, C. S. S., 'A Reappraisal of the Sceatta and Styca Coinage of Northumbria', British Numismatic Journal 28 (1955–7), 227–42
- Metcalf, D. M., ed., Coinage in Ninth-Century Northumbria (Oxford, 1987)
- Pagan, H. E., 'Coinage in the Age of Burgred', British Numismatic Journal 34 (1965), 11–27
- Pagan, H. E., 'Northumbrian Numismatic Chronology in the Ninth Century', British Numismatic Journal 38 (1969), 1–15
- Pagan, H. E., 'The Bolton Percy Hoard of 1967', British Numismatic Journal 43 (1973), 1–44
- Pagan, H. E., 'The Coinage of the East Anglian Kingdom from 825 to 870', British Numismatic Journal 52 (1982), 41–83
- Pagan, H. E., 'Coinage in Southern England, 796–874', in Anglo-Saxon Monetary History: Essays in Memory of Michael Dolley, ed. M. A. S. Blackburn (Leicester, 1986), pp. 45–65

=== Viking coinages ===
- Blackburn, M. A. S., 'The Ashdon (Essex) Hoard and the Currency of the Southern Danelaw in the Late Ninth Century', British Numismatic Journal 59 (1989), 13–38
- Blackburn, M. A. S., 'Expansion and Control: Aspects of Anglo-Scandinavian Minting South of the Humber', in Vikings and the Danelaw: Selected Papers from the Proceedings of the Thirteenth Viking Congress, Nottingham and York, 21–30 August 1997, ed. J. Graham Campbell (Oxford, 2001), pp. 125–42
- Blackburn, M. A. S., 'The Coinage of Scandinavian York', in Aspects of Anglo-Scandinavian York, ed. R. Hall et al. (York, 2004), pp. 325–49
- Blunt, C. E., 'The St Edmund Memorial Coinage', Proceedings of the Suffolk Institute of Archaeology 31 (1969), 234–53
- Blunt, C. E., and B. H. I. H. Stewart, 'The Coinage of Regnald I of York and the Bossall Hoard', Numismatic Chronicle 143 (1983), 146–63
- Dolley, R. H. M., Viking Coins of the Danelaw and Dublin (London, 1965)
- Dolley, R. H. M., 'The Anglo-Danish and Anglo-Norse Coinages of York', in Viking-Age York and the North, ed. R. A. Hall, Council for British Archaeology Research Report 27 (London, 1978), pp. 26–31
- Grierson, P., and M. A. S. Blackburn, Medieval European Coinage, I: the Early Middle Ages (5th–10th Centuries) (Cambridge, 1986), pp. 316–25
- Lyon, C. S. S., and B. H. I. H. Stewart, 'The Northumbrian Viking Coinage in the Cuerdale Hoard', in Anglo-Saxon Coins: Studies Presented to F. M. Stenton on the Occasion of His 80th Birthday, 17 May 1960, ed. R. H. M. Dolley (London, 1961), pp. 96–121

=== The 10th century ===
- Blunt, C. E., 'The Coinage of Æthelstan, King of England 924–39', British Numismatic Journal 42 (1974), 35–160
- Blunt, C. E., B. H. I. H. Stewart and C. S. S. Lyon, Coinage in Tenth-Century England from Edward the Elder to Edgar's Reform (London, 1989)
- Jonsson, K., 'The Pre-Reform Coinage of Edgar – the Legacy of the Anglo-Saxon Kingdoms', in Coinage and History in the North Sea World, c. 500 – 1250. Essays in Honour of Marion Archibald, ed. B. Cook and G. Williams (Leiden, 2006), pp. 325–46
- Lyon, C. S. S., 'The Coinage of Edward the Elder', in Edward the Elder, 899–924, ed. N. J. Higham and D. H. Hill (London, 2001), pp. 67–78
- Pagan, H. E., 'The Pre-Reform Coinage of Edgar', in Edgar, King of the English 959-975. New Interpretations, ed. D. Scragg (Woodbridge, 2008), pp. 192–207

=== Edgar's reform and the late Anglo-Saxon coinage ===
- Blackburn, M. A. S., and K. Jonsson, 'The Anglo-Saxon and Anglo-Norman Element of North European Coin Finds', in Viking-Age Coinage in the Northern Lands. The Sixth Oxford Symposium on Coinage and Monetary History, ed. M. A. S. Blackburn and D. M. Metcalf (Oxford, 1981), pp. 147–255
- Brand, J. D., Periodic Change of Type in the Anglo-Saxon and Norman Periods (Rochester, 1984)
- Dolley, R. H. M., The Norman Conquest and the English Coinage (London, 1966)
- Dolley, R. H. M., 'An Introduction to the Coinage of Æthelred II', in Ethelred the Unready: Papers from the Millenary Conference, ed. D. Hill (Oxford, 1978), pp. 115–33
- Dolley, R. H. M., and D. M. Metcalf, 'The Reform of the English Coinage under Edgar', in Anglo-Saxon Coins: Studies Presented to F. M. Stenton on the Occasion of His 80th Birthday, 17 May 1960, ed. R. H. M. Dolley (London, 1961), pp. 136–68
- Freeman, A., The Moneyer and the Mint in the Reign of Edward the Confessor 1042–66, 2 vols. (Oxford, 1985)
- Hildebrand, B. E., Anglosachsiska mynt i Svenska Kongliga Myntkabinettet funna in Sveriges jord, 2nd ed. (Stockholm, 1881)
- Jonsson, K., The New Era: the Reformation of the Late Anglo-Saxon Coinage (Stockholm, 1986)
- Jonsson, K., Viking-Age Hoards and Late Anglo-Saxon Coins: a Study in Honour of Bror Emil Hildebrand's Anglosachsiska mynt (Stockholm, 1987)
- Metcalf, D. M., An Atlas of Anglo-Saxon and Norman Coin Finds, c. 973 – 1086 (London, 1998)
- Petersson, H. B. A., Anglo-Saxon Currency: King Edgar's Reform to the Norman Conquest (Lund, 1969)
- Smart, V., 'Scandinavians, Celts and Germans in Anglo-Saxon England: the Evidence of Moneyers' Names', in Anglo-Saxon Monetary History: Essays in Memory of Michael Dolley, ed. M. A. S. Blackburn (Leicester, 1986), pp. 171–84
- Stewart, B. H. I. H., 'Coinage and Recoinage after Edgar's Reform', in Studies in Late Anglo-Saxon Coinage in Memory of Bror Emil Hildebrand, ed. K. Jonsson (Stockholm, 1990), pp. 455–85
