= Quendrida =

Quendrida, a Latinisation of the Anglo-Saxon female names Cynethryth and Cwenthryth, may refer to:

- Cynethryth (fl. 770–798), wife of King Offa of Mercia
- Cwenthryth (fl. 811–825), daughter of King Coenwulf of Mercia
