= Queen Ælfthryth =

Queen Ælfthryth can refer to:

- Ælfthryth, wife of King Coenwulf of Mercia (fl. 810s)
- Ælfthryth (wife of Edgar), king of England, mother of Ethelred the Unready (d. 1000)
