= Ælfthryth of Mercia =

Ælfthryth (Old English: Ælfðryð, fl. AD 810s) was the wife of the Mercian King Coenwulf, and had his two children, Cynehelm and Cwoenthryth.

Ælfthryth is established as Coenwulf's wife from charter evidence, being recorded on charters dated between 804 and 817. It is possible that Ælfthryth was Coenwulf's second wife as a charter of 799 records a different wife of Coenwulf. Although the charter is forged, this detail is possibly accurate.
