= Eadberht III Præn =

8th-century Anglo-Saxon King of Kent

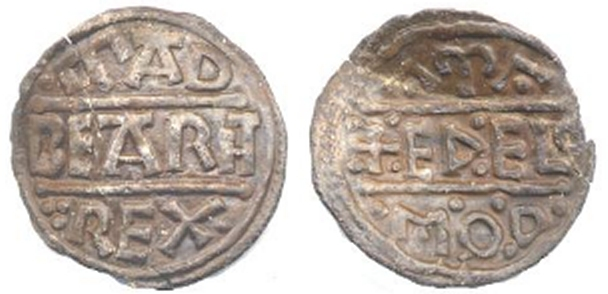
Coin of Eadberht III

Eadberht III Præn was the King of Kent from 796 to 798. His brief reign was the result of a rebellion against the hegemony of Mercia, and it marked the last time that Kent existed as an independent kingdom.

Offa of Mercia seems to have ruled Kent directly from 785 until 796, when the Anglo-Saxon Chronicle records that Offa died and Eadberht, "who was by another name Præn", took possession of Kent. Eadberht had apparently previously been in exile on the continent under the protection of Charlemagne, and his rebellion has been seen as serving Frankish interests.

The pro-Mercian Archbishop of Canterbury, Æthelhard, fled during the rebellion. Cœnwulf of Mercia was engaged in correspondence with Pope Leo III at this time concerning the situation of the Church in England, and in the course of this Leo accepted a Mercian reconquest of Kent and excommunicated Eadberht, on the grounds that he was a former priest. Having received papal approval, Cœnwulf reconquered Kent. He placed his brother in charge and captured Eadberht in 798. According to the Anglo-Saxon Chronicle, Cœnwulf "ravaged over Kent and captured Eadberht Præn, their king, and led him bound into Mercia." A later addition to the Chronicle says that Eadberht was blinded and had his hands cut off, but Roger of Wendover states that he was set free by Coenwulf at some point as an act of clemency.

== See also ==
- List of monarchs of Kent

Preceded by Ealhmund	King of Kent; 796–798	Succeeded by Cuðred
