= Cuthred of Kent =

King of Kent from 798 to 807

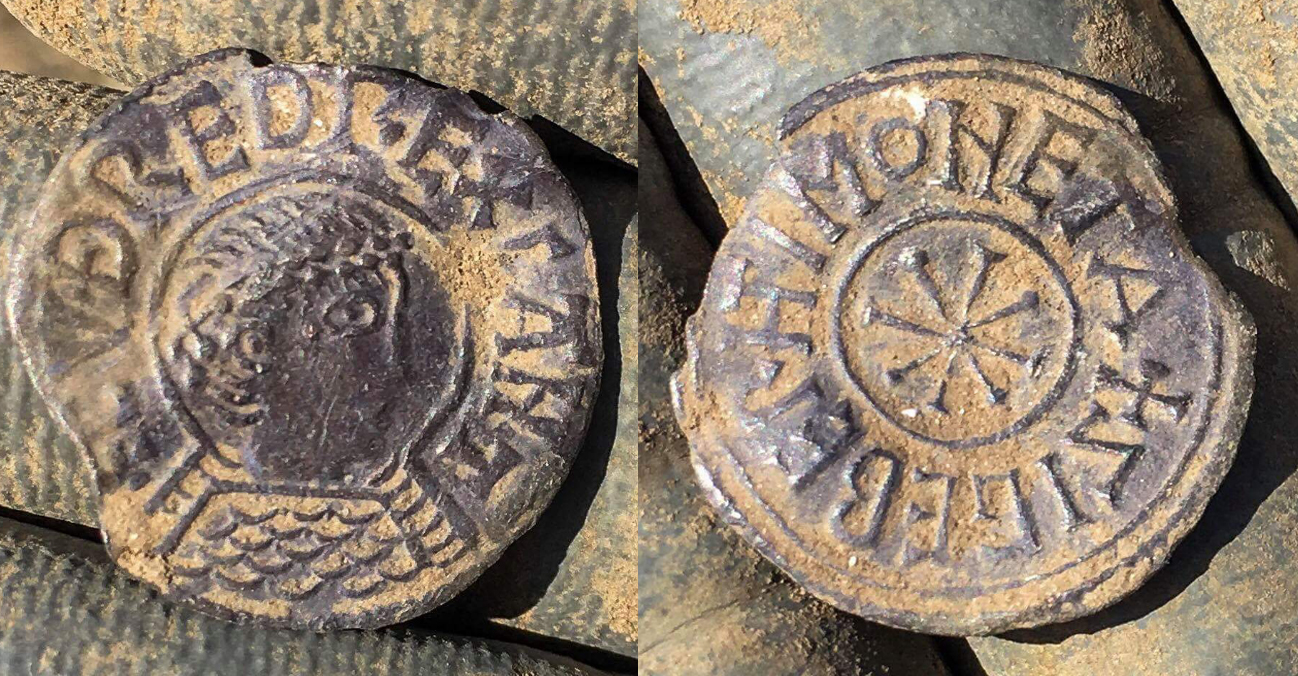
Coin bearing the name of Cuthred and depicting him

Cuthred (Old English: Cuþræd) was the King of Kent from 798 to 807.

After the revolt of Kent under Eadberht III Præn was defeated in 798 by Coenwulf, Cuthred was established as a client king. During Cuthred's reign, the Archbishopric of Lichfield was formally abolished at the Council of Clovesho on 12 October 803, and the Archbishopric of Canterbury thus regained the status of which Offa of Mercia had sought to deprive it. Cuthred's reign also saw the first raids on Kent by the Vikings. After his death in 807, Cœnwulf seems to have acted as King of Kent.

Cuthred died in 807, according to the Anglo-Saxon Chronicle. He issued coins and charters. His surviving charters are both dated 805, one precisely to 26 July 805, in the eighth year of his reign, so his accession fell between 27 July 797 and 26 July 798. In two charters issued by Cœnwulf, King of Mercia, he is described as brother of that king.

== Family ==
Coenwulf's family tree

Cuthred has been identified as one of three known sons of Cuthberht of Mercia, his brothers were Coenwulf (King of Mercia 796-821) and Ceolwulf (King of Mercia 821-823)

Cuthred has been identified as the father of Coenwald, and may also be the father of Cyneberht.

== See also ==
List of monarchs of Kent

Preceded by Eadberht III Præn	King of Kent; 798–807	Succeeded by Cœnwulf
