= Eadwald of East Anglia =

King of a small Anglo-Saxon kingdom

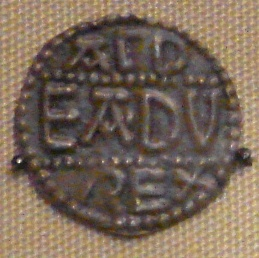
Coin of Eadwald

Eadwald of East Anglia was an obscure king of the small Anglo-Saxon kingdom of East Anglia (Old English: Ēast Engla Rīce) from around the year 796 to some point between 798 and 805. He lived at a time when East Anglia was eclipsed by its more powerful neighbour, Mercia. After his deposition, submission, or death, Mercian control was restored under Coenwulf and the East Anglians lost their independence for a quarter of a century. Knowledge of Eadwald's short reign comes almost solely from the few surviving coins that were minted under his name. No details of his life or reign are known.

== Background ==
The kingdom of East Anglia (Old English: Ēast Engla Rīce) was a small independent Anglo-Saxon kingdom that comprised what are now the English counties of Norfolk and Suffolk. It perhaps also included the eastern part of the Fens in Cambridgeshire, a region that was disputed between the East Angles and their neighbours, the Mercians. Created in the wake of the Anglo-Saxon settlement of Britain, the kingdom was ruled from the 6th century by the Wuffingas, the most powerful member of the dynasty being Rædwald, the first definitely known to have been king. The Wuffingas retained their dynastic power until the end of the reign of the poorly recorded Ælfwald in 749. After Ælfwald, the East Angles were ruled independently by kings of unknown lineage, until in 794 Æthelberht was killed on the order of Offa of Mercia, who then consolidated his control over the kingdom. East Anglia briefly strove for independence after 796, the year that Offa was succeeded by his son Ecgfrith. Ecgfrith died after a rule of only five months and was succeeded by a distant kinsman, Coenwulf. The East Angles were conquered by the Danes in 869, to form part of the Danelaw. In 918, the region was conquered by Edward the Elder and was incorporated into the Kingdom of England.

== Coinage ==
What is known about Eadwald comes from coins inscribed with his name. These are rare today; only around 12 are known to exist. At the time that Offa ruled the East Angles, his Mercian coins were minted in East Anglia. The moneyers who went on to work for Eadwald adopted a distinctive style that used runic letters, similar to those of Offa's coins.

== Rule ==
Practically nothing is known of Eadwald's life or reign, and he is not mentioned in any literacy sources—for instance the Anglo-Saxon Chronicle omits any mention of an East Anglian king for this period. It is not known with any certainty for how long he was king. Evidence from coins minted at this time suggests the East Angles seemed to have regained their independence for a short period after Ecgfrith's death, with Eadwald as their king, but the East Angles were then reconquered after Coenwulf became king of Mercia in 798, during a campaign in which the kingdom of Kent was also brought back under Mercian control. Although the dates for Eadwald's rule are unknown, Coenwulf was minting coins in East Anglia under his own name by c. 805.

English royalty
Preceded by Offa	King of East Anglia; 796 – 798	Succeeded by Coenwulf
