= Mancus =

Term used in early medieval Europe to denote a certain gold coin

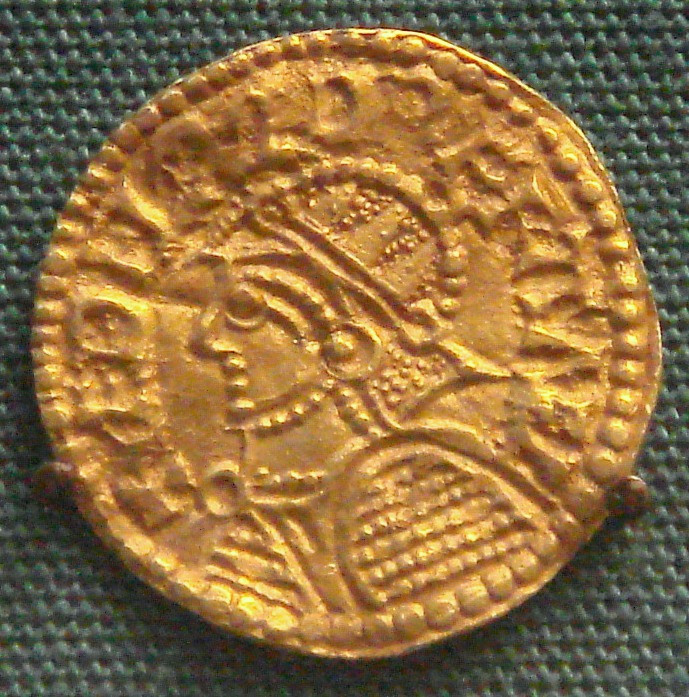
A mancus of king Æthelred II, 1003–1006.

Mancus (sometimes spelt mancosus or similar, from Arabic manqūsh منقوش) was a term used in early medieval Europe to denote either a gold coin, a weight of gold of 4.25g (equivalent to the Islamic gold dinar, and thus lighter than the Byzantine solidus), or a unit of account of thirty silver pence. This made it worth about a month's wages for a skilled worker, such as a craftsman or a soldier. Distinguishing between these uses can be extremely difficult: the will of the Anglo-Saxon king Eadred, who died in 955, illustrates the problem well with its request that "two thousand mancuses of gold be taken and minted into mancuses" (nime man twentig hund mancusa goldes and gemynetige to mancusan).

== Term ==
The origin of the word mancus has long been a cause of debate. It is now generally accepted that mancus derives from the Arabic word منقوش manqūsh (from the triliteral verbal root n-q-sh 'to sculpt, engrave, inscribe'), which was often employed in a numismatic context to mean 'struck'. Philip Grierson once linked it to the Latin adjective mancus, meaning 'defective', which was thought to be a reference to the poor quality of gold coinage circulating in 8th-century Italy.

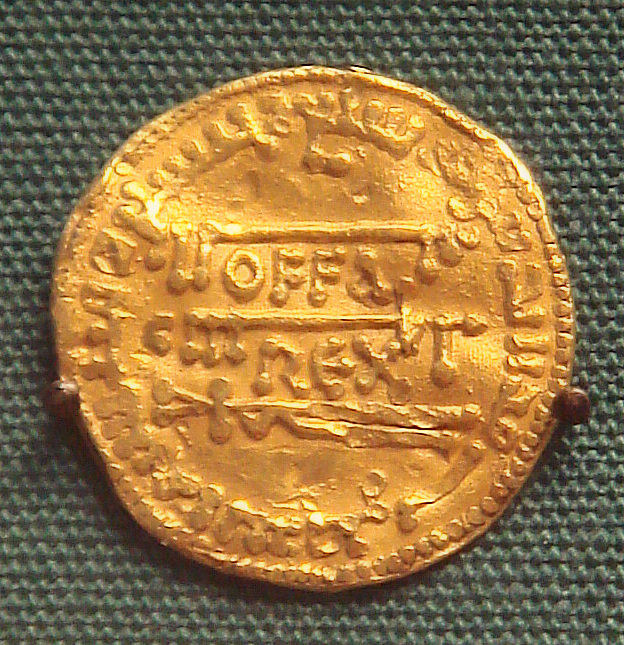
A mancus, or gold dinar, of the English king Offa of Mercia (757–796), a copy of the dinars of the Abbasid Caliphate (774). It combines the Latin legend OFFA REX with Arabic legends. The date of A.H. 157 (773–774 AD) is readable. British Museum.

After its first appearance in the 770s, use of the term mancus quickly spread across northern and central Italy, and leapfrogged over Gaul to reach England by the 780s. A letter written in 798 to King Coenwulf of the Mercians by Pope Leo III mentions a promise made in 786 by King Offa to send 365 mancuses to Rome every year. Use of the term mancus was at a peak between the 9th and 11th centuries, and was only restricted to very specific locations and contexts thereafter.

== Coins ==
The number of actual gold coins circulating in the west that would have been termed mancuses is difficult to calculate. Because of their high value, such coins were less likely than other pieces to be lost, whilst the rarity of gold and its close relationship to bullion meant that coins were often melted down for re-use. Indeed, many gold coins minted in the west between the 8th and 13th centuries were struck in small numbers with a specific purpose in mind, and probably did not circulate commercially in quite the same way as silver coins. In many cases they had strong associations with specific issuing authorities such as a king (e.g., Coenwulf of Mercia), emperor (like Louis the Pious) or archbishop (e.g., Wigmund of York). On the other hand, they might not reference any king at all, and may relate to the issuing city (e.g., Chartres) or moneyer (like Pendred and Ciolhard at London under Offa). Some gold pieces were simply struck from regular silver dies. In addition to these gold pieces with meaningful inscriptions issued in the west, there circulated some genuine Arabic dinars and imitations of them. Several of these imitative dinars—including the famous example bearing the name of Offa of Mercia—are based on originals struck in the year 157 AH (773 or 774 AD). The precise significance of this remains uncertain: it may be that careful copies of a coin of this year circulated widely, or that particularly many dinars of this year entered the west for some reason.

For all that the surviving western specimens of early medieval gold coins must represent only a tiny proportion of the original stock, it must be borne in mind that before the 13th century gold coins were extremely rare in western Europe: in England, for instance, only eight native gold pieces with meaningful legends are known from c. 650 to 1066, which can be complemented by finds from the same period of half a dozen Arabic gold and perhaps ten Carolingian gold pieces or imitations of them. Substantial and regular production of gold coinage only resumed in the 13th century.

== See also ==
- Islamic contributions to Medieval Europe
- Coinage in Anglo-Saxon England

== Bibliography ==
- Blackburn, M. A. S., 'Gold in England During the "Age of Silver" (eighth–eleventh centuries)', in The Silver Economy of the Viking Age, ed. J. Graham-Campbell & Gareth Williams (2007) Walnut Creek, CA: Left Coast Press, pp. 55–95
- Day, William R. (2003). "The Monetary Reforms of Charlemagne and the Circulation of Money in Early Medieval Campania". Early Medieval Europe, 6(1), 25–45. doi:10.1111/1468-0254.00002
- Duplessy, J., 'La circulation des monnaies arabes en Europe occidentale du VIIIe au XIIIe siècle', Révue numismatique 5th series no. 18 (1956), 101–64
- Grierson, P., 'The Gold Solidus of Louis the Pious and its Imitations', Jaarboek voor Munt- en Penningkunde 38 (1951), 1–41; repr. in his Dark Age Economics (London, 1979), no. VII
- Grierson, P., 'Carolingian Europe and the Arabs: the myth of the mancus', Revue belge de philologie et d'histoire 32 (1954), 1059–74
- Grierson, Philip & Blackburn, M. A. S., Medieval European Coinage, volume 1: the Early Middle Ages (fifth to tenth centuries) (Cambridge: Cambridge University Press, 1986) ISBN 978-0-521-03177-6), pp. 326–31
- Medieval European Coinage: Volume 1, The Early Middle Ages (5th-10th Centuries) page 270 By Philip Grierson, Mark Blackburn, states with detailed evidence that the word Mancus is of Arabic origin.
- Ilish, L., 'Die imitativen solidi mancusi. "Arabische" Goldmünzen der Karolingerzeit’, in Fundamenta Historiae. Geschichte im Spiegel der Numismatik und ihrer Nachbarwissenschaften. Festschrift für Niklot Klüssendorf zum 60. Geburtstag am 10. Februar 2004, ed. R. Cunz (Hannover, 2004), pp. 91–106
- Linder-Welin, Ulla S., 'Some rare Samanid Dirhams and the Origin of the Word "Mancusus"', in Congresso internazionale de numismatica, Rome 1961, 2 vols. (Rome, 1965) II. pp. 499–508
- McCormick, M., Origins of the European Economy: communications and commerce AD 300-900 (Cambridge, 2001), ch. 11
- Ring, Richard. "The Missing Mancus and the Early Medieval Economy". In Michael Frassetto, John Hosler and Matthew Gabriele (eds.), Where Heaven and Earth Meet: Essays on Medieval Europe in Honor of Daniel F. Callahan (Brill, 2014), pp. 33–41. doi:10.1163/9789004274167_004
