= Cwenthryth =

9th century princess of Mercia

Cwenthryth (fl. 811-c.827) was a daughter of King Coenwulf of Mercia. In 811 she witnessed a charter of her father as filia regis (king's daughter). She was abbess of Winchcombe Minster, Reculver and Minster in Thanet, which she inherited from her father. She also inherited a dispute with Wulfred, Archbishop of Canterbury, over control of Reculver and Minster in Thanet. Coenwulf died in 821 and in 825 Wulfred launched a lawsuit to force her to submit to him and by 827 he had gained control over the properties. She is not recorded after that year.

According to a late and unreliable source, Cwenthryth murdered her brother, Cynehelm, who was later described as Saint Kenelm in a late eleventh-century hagiography and venerated in the later Middle Ages.

== Sources ==
- Kelly, S. E. (2004). "Cwenthryth (fl. 811–c. 827)". Oxford Dictionary of National Biography. Oxford University Press. doi:10.1093/ref:odnb/54441. (subscription, Wikipedia Library access or UK public library membership required)
- Rollason, David (2004). "Cynehelm [St Cynehelm, Kenelm (supp. fl. 803x11)". Oxford Dictionary of National Biography. Oxford University Press. doi:10.1093/ref:odnb/39213. (subscription, Wikipedia Library access or UK public library membership required)
