= 700s (decade) =

Decade

The 700s decade ran from January 1, 700, to December 31, 709.

== Events ==
=== 700 ===
==== By place ====
====== Byzantine Empire ======
- Avar and Slavic tribes conquer Byzantine territories in the Balkans, occupying lands as far south as the Peloponnese peninsula in southern Greece (approximate date).

====== Europe ======
- King Cunipert dies after a 12-year reign, and is succeeded by his son Liutpert. He rules the Lombard Kingdom together with Ansprand, duke of Asti, as regent.
- Raginpert, duke of Turin, deposes King Liutpert after an eight months' reign. He usurps the Lombard throne and puts his son Aripert in line for the succession.
- Pepin of Herstal, mayor of the palace, extends the Frankish Kingdom and annexes Thuringia. He turns the war towards the Alemanni (approximate date).

====== Britain ======
- King Geraint of Dumnonia receives a letter from Aldhelm, bishop of Sherborne, who insists that the Celtic Church comply with the doctrines of Rome.
- King Ine of Wessex begins to dispense with Wessex sub-kings and replace them with ealdormen (approximate date).
- The Eóganachta, an Irish dynasty centred around Cashel, begins to dominate southern Ireland (approximate date).
- Hamwic emerges as a major Wessex trading town (approximate date).

====== Arabian Empire ======
- Mohammad ibn al-Ash'ath revolts against Caliph Abd al-Malik ibn Marwan in the Sistan and Balochistan regions (Iran).
- The Umayyad prince Abdallah ibn Abd al-Malik captures the Byzantine stronghold of Theodosiopolis in Armenia.
- Musa ibn Nusayr defeats the Berber forces in Algeria, ending resistance against the Arabs (approximate date).
- The African slave trade through the Sahara is so extensive that the town of Zawila (Tunisia) is established.

====== Mesoamerica ======
- Maya civilization: Tikal Temple I, called the "Temple of the Giant Jaguar" (tomb of Jasaw Chan Kʼawiil I), Tikal, (Guatemala), is built.
- Diquis culture (modern Costa Rica) starts in Central America (approximate date).

====== North America ======
- The Mount Edziza volcanic complex erupts in northern British Columbia, Canada.

====== South America ======
- The Wariʼ people invade and occupy the Cuzco Valley (modern Peru) in the southern highlands (approximate date).
- The Moche culture in the northern part of modern day Peru collapses, largely due to environmental problems and/or political and social unrest (approximate date).

==== By topic ====
====== Art ======
- The Amida Buddha, a fresco in the kon-dō (Hōryū-ji Temple), is made (Nara period) (approximate date).

====== Religion ======
- Adomnán, Irish abbot, convinces 51 kings to adopt the Cáin Adomnáin, which defines the relationship between women and priests.
- Queen Cuthburh of Northumbria enters religious life. The Anglo-Saxon religious community at St. Mary's Nunnery is re-founded.
- Willibrord, Anglo-Saxon missionary, founds a mission post at Emmerich am Rhein (Germany), in the Utrecht Diocese.
- The Beverley Grammar School (East Yorkshire) is founded by bishop John of Beverley (approximate date).
- The Lindisfarne Gospels, an illuminated manuscript (Gospel Book), is produced in Northumbria.
- The famous Catholic Eucharistic Miracle occurs in Lanciano (Italy).

=== 701 ===
==== By place ====
====== Europe ======
- Raginpert dies, and King Liutpert (succeeded and deposed in 700) returns to the throne of the Lombards. Raginpert's son Aripert captures Liutpert at his capital in Pavia, and will have him strangled in his bath. Aripert becomes new ruler of the Lombard Kingdom in Italy.
- King Egica dies, possibly assassinated in a plot led by Roderic. He is succeeded by his son Wittiza as king of the Visigoths (approximate date).

====== Balkans ======
- Asparuh, founder of the First Bulgarian Empire, dies after a 20-year reign. He is succeeded by his son Tervel, who becomes ruler (khan) of the Bulgarians.

====== Arabian Empire ======
- Battle of Dayr al-Jamajim: Caliph Abd al-Malik ibn Marwan sends Syrian troops to reinforce the Muslim army of Al-Hajjaj ibn Yusuf. He faces a 200,000-man army under Abd al-Rahman ibn Muhammad ibn al-Ash'ath near Kufa (modern Iraq). Al-Ash'ath is defeated, and his rebellion against the Umayyad Caliphate fails.
- Arab conquest of Armenia: Umayyad prince Muhammad ibn Marwan invades the Byzantine Armenian provinces east of the Euphrates; local commander Baanes surrenders before a large Arab army, and the population accepts a Muslim governor.
- Muslims from the Arabian Peninsula destroy the then-Axum-controlled port of Adulis, thus causing the decline of Ethiopian Christianity on the African Red Sea coast (approximate date).
- Arab merchants introduce Oriental spices into Mediterranean markets. Muslim merchant vessels visit the Maluku Islands (South East Asia) for the first time (approximate date).

====== Japan ======
- The Gagakuryo (Bureau of Court Music) is formed at the Imperial Court in Kyoto. Numerous types of music and dance are performed.
- Emperor Monmu becomes sole proprietor of all the nation's land, through a codification of political law (Code of Taihō).

==== By topic ====
====== Religion ======
- September 8 – Pope Sergius I dies at Rome after a 14-year reign. He is succeeded by John VI as the 85th pope of the Catholic Church.

=== 702 ===
==== By place ====
====== Europe ======
- Hedan II, duke of Thuringia, completes the circular Marienkirche, in Fortress Marienberg near Würzburg (Germany).

====== Arabian Empire ======
- Arab conquest of Armenia: Large-scale Armenian rebellion against Muslim rule breaks out, with Byzantine support.
- Muslim-Arabs under Musa ibn Nusayr conquer Tangier and Sous, taking control of all Morocco (approximate date).
- Ethiopian (Axumite) raiders occupy the port of Jeddah (modern Saudi Arabia).

====== Mesoamerica ======
- February 20 – Kʼinich Kan Bahlam II, ruler (ajaw) of Palenque, dies after an 18-year reign. He is succeeded by his brother Kʼinich Kʼan Joy Chitam II.

==== By topic ====
====== Religion ======
- Berhtwald, archbishop of Canterbury, calls the Council of Austerfield to decide the rights of Wilfrid, some-time bishop of York. He is offered Ripon Abbey if he will relinquish his claims as bishop. Wilfrid rejects this offer and appeals to Rome.

=== 703 ===
==== By place ====
====== Byzantine Empire ======
- Arab–Byzantine War: The Umayyad army under Abdallah ibn Abd al-Malik captures Mopsuestia in Cilicia from the Byzantines, and refortifies it, making it the first major Muslim stronghold in the area that will later become the Thughur.
- Musa ibn Nusayr, governor of Ifriqiya (western Libya), builds a Muslim fleet to harass the Byzantine navy and conquer the islands of Ibiza, Mallorca, and Menorca (approximate date).

====== Europe ======
- Faroald II, duke of Spoleto, attacks the Exarchate of Ravenna in Italy, after the death of his father Thrasimund I. King Aripert II of the Lombards, desiring good relations with the Byzantine Empire and papacy, refuses to assist him.

====== Britain ======
- High King Loingsech mac Óengusso and his forces are routed during an invasion of Connacht (Ireland). He is killed by the men of King Cellach mac Rogallaig (approximate date).

==== By topic ====
====== Religion ======
- Wilfrid, Anglo-Saxon bishop, travels to Rome again, and is supported in his struggle to retain his see of York by the pope. On his way Wilfrid stops in Frisia (modern Netherlands), to visit Willibrord.
- Elias I becomes Catholicos of All Armenians.

=== 704 ===
==== By place ====
====== Byzantine Empire ======
- After spending nearly a decade with the Khazars (a Turkic tribe which controls a Steppe empire), the deposed emperor Justinian II flees from his exile at Cherson (Crimea). He escapes with help from Busir, ruler (khagan) of the Khazars, who marries him to his sister Theodora.
- Autumn – Emperor Tiberios III tries to bribe Busir and dispatches two Khazar officials, Papatzys and Balgitzin, to kill Justinian. Warned by his wife, he flees to the Bulgar Khanate, securing the assistance of the Bulgarian ruler Tervel, in exchange for financial considerations.
- Arab–Byzantine War: A Byzantine expeditionary force under Heraclius (brother of Tiberios III) defeats and destroys an Umayyad army (10,000 men) at Sisium (modern Turkey) under Yazid ibn Hunayn, killing most and leading the others off in chains to Constantinople.

====== Britain ======
- King Æthelred I abdicates the throne after a 30-year reign and becomes an abbot at Bardney (Lincolnshire). He is succeeded by his nephew Cenred (Coenred), a son of the late king Wulfhere, who becomes ruler of Mercia.
- December 14 – King Aldfrith of Northumbria dies after a 20-year reign. His throne is seized by Eadwulf I, of unknown descent. Wilfrid travels to Driffield to support Eadwulf, but his advances are rejected (approximate date).

====== Arabian Empire ======
- Arab conquest of Armenia: The Muslim Arabs under Abdallah ibn Abd al-Malik (a son of caliph Abd al-Malik ibn Marwan) invade Armenia and subdue the anti-Arab revolt along with his uncle Muhammad ibn Marwan.
- Winter – Abdallah ibn Abd al-Malik is recalled from Armenia to serve as governor of Egypt. He requires that government business be done in Arabic instead of Coptic. His tenure is marred by famine and corruption.

====== Asia ======
- Emperor Tridu Songtsen dies in battle, and is succeeded by his mother Khri ma lod, who becomes de facto ruler of the Tibetan Empire. She begins a massive expansion into the Tarim Basin and Northern China.

=== 705 ===
==== By place ====
====== Byzantine Empire ======
- Spring – An army of 15,000 Bulgar and Slav horsemen under Justinian II appear before the walls of Constantinople. After three days, his troops discover an unused water conduit under the walls of the city, and enter through the Valens Aqueduct. Hearing that Justinian has taken control of the Blachernae Palace, Emperor Tiberios III flees to Bithynia (modern Turkey), where he evades capture for several months.
- Justinian II ascends to the throne again and rewards his ally Tervel, ruler (khagan) of the Bulgarian Empire, for his assistance with the title of kaisar (Caesar), which makes him second only to Justinian and the first foreign ruler in Byzantine history to receive such a title, and a territorial concession in northeastern Thrace, a region called Zagora in modern-day Bulgaria.

====== Europe ======
- Duke Gisulf I of Benevento captures the cities of Sora, Arpino, and Arce (Central Italy). He marches as far as Horrea, plundering and burning, before he is confronted with gifts by the ambassadors of Pope John VI, who ransom many of his captives.

====== Britain ======
- King Ine of Wessex becomes estranged from the kings Sigeheard and Swæfred of Essex, who are sheltering exiled rivals to the Wessex throne. At a council at Brentford, the latter agree to banish the exiles in return for Ine not attacking their kingdom.
- Prince Osred of Northumbria, assisted by ealdorman, defeats the usurper Eadwulf I. He becomes king at the age of nine; the government is controlled by the powerful bishop Wilfrid.
- King Geraint of Dumnonia grants land at Maker (Cornwall) to Sherborne Abbey, in an attempt to strengthen his position in the disputed regions of Dorset (approximate date).

====== Arabian Empire ======
- Arab forces gain power in Central Asia, as Qutayba ibn Muslim becomes governor of Khorasan. The region has grown rich from trade with China and Eastern Europe, its merchants dealing in silk, furs, amber, honey, and walrus ivory. During his rule, Qutayba subjugates the mercantile cities of Bukhara and Samarkand (modern Uzbekistan), as well as the Oxus delta area of Khwarezm, south of the Aral Sea.
- October 8 – Caliph Abd al-Malik ibn Marwan dies in his winter resort at Al-Sinnabra (Palestine), after a 20-year reign. During his rule, the financial administration of the Umayyad Caliphate has been reorganized. Arab coins have replaced former Byzantine and Sassanian coins, and regular postal service has been established between Damascus and the provincial capitals. Abd al-Malik is succeeded by his son Al-Walid I.
- Arab conquest of Armenia: Large-scale Armenian rebellion is suppressed by Muhammad ibn Marwan. He captures and deports Smbat VI Bagratuni and other leading princes. Many of the captured nakharar are gathered into churches and burned alive at Nakhchevan (modern Azerbaijan).
- Arab general Musa ibn Nusayr conquers the city of Tlemcen in Algeria; once and for all solidifying Al-Maghreb Al-Awsat (Modern-day Algeria), which makes way for the stabilization of the entirety of North Africa a couple years later.

====== Asia ======
- February 22 – Empress Wu Zetian is deposed in a coup d'état organized by her chancellor Zhang Jianzhi, after a 15-year reign. His chief ministers gain support from some generals to seize the imperial palace and execute the Zhang brothers. They reinstall her son Zhong Zong, whom she deposed 15 years ago, restoring the Tang dynasty. This marks the end of the short-lived Zhou dynasty in China.
- Nishiyama Onsen Keiunkan, a hot spring hotel, is founded in Hayakawa, Yamanashi Prefecture, Japan. It is the oldest hotel in the world and has been operated by the same family for 52 generations.

==== By topic ====
====== Religion ======
- January 11 – Pope John VI dies at Rome, after a reign of little more than 3 years. During his rule, he protected the Byzantine exarch Theophylactus, when he invaded the Italian mainland from Sicily. He also induced Gisulf I, Lombard duke of Benevento, to withdraw from Byzantine territory, ransomed captives and ordered the restoration of Wilfrid, as deposed bishop of York. He is succeeded by John VII as the 86th pope of the Catholic Church.
- Al-Walid I commissions the construction of Al-Aqsa Mosque located in the Old City of Jerusalem (approximate date).

=== 706 ===
==== By place ====
====== Byzantine Empire ======
- February 15 – Emperor Justinian II presides over the public humiliation of his predecessors, Leontios and Tiberios III, and their chief associates in the Hippodrome of Constantinople, after which they are executed. Patriarch Kallinikos I is also deposed, blinded and exiled to Rome, and succeeded by Kyros.

====== Europe ======
- Duke Corvulus of Friuli is arrested by King Aripert II of the Lombards, and has his eyes gouged out. He is replaced by Pemmo, who begins a war against the Slavs of Carinthia (modern Austria).

====== China ======
- July 2 – Emperor Zhong Zong has the remains of his mother and recently deceased ruling empress Wu Zetian, her son Li Xian, her grandson Li Chongrun, and granddaughter Li Xianhui, all interred in the same tomb complex as his father and Wu Zetian's husband Gao Zong, outside Chang'an, known as the Qianling Mausoleum, located on Mount Liang, which will then remain unopened until 1960.

==== By topic ====
====== Religion ======
- Berhtwald, archbishop of Canterbury, is obliged by the pope's insistence to call the Synod of Nidd (Northumbria).
- Caliph Al-Walid I commissions the construction of the Great Mosque of Damascus (Syria).

=== 707 ===
==== By place ====
====== Byzantine Empire ======
- Arab–Byzantine War: An Umayyad army under Maslamah ibn Abd al-Malik invades Asia Minor, and lays siege to Tyana (Cappadocia). The fortress city resists, dragging the siege through the winter and into 708.

====== Arabian Empire ======
- The Muslim-Arabs conquer the Balearic Islands in the Mediterranean Sea (approximate date).
- The first Islamic hospital (bimaristan) is founded in Damascus (approximate date).

====== Asia ======
- July 18 – Emperor Monmu dies after a 10-year reign. He is succeeded by his aunt Genmei, who becomes the 43rd empress of Japan. She is the sister of former empress Jitō, and the niece and wife of late emperor Tenmu.

==== By topic ====
====== Religion ======
- October 18 – Pope John VII dies at Rome after a 19-month reign. A prolonged sede vacante exists, until the ratification of the election of Sisinnius by the Exarch of Ravenna, in early 708.

=== 708 ===
==== By place ====
====== Byzantine Empire ======
- Arab–Byzantine War: The Umayyads under Maslamah ibn Abd al-Malik capture and sack the Byzantine city of Tyana (Cappadocia) after a prolonged siege, and following a victory over a Byzantine relief army. Maslamah also leads another expedition in the summer, raiding and conquering Amorium (modern Turkey).

====== Europe ======
- Battle of Anchialus: A Byzantine expeditionary force under Emperor Justinian II is defeated near the seaside city of Anchialus, on the Black Sea Coast. The Byzantines are overwhelmed by a surprise attack of Bulgarian cavalry, led by Tervel. Justinian manages to reach the fortress, and escapes to Constantinople on a ship.

====== Asia ======
- Nazaktar Khan, a Turk Shahi prince in alliance with the Tibetan Empire, captures Bactria from the Umayyads.
- August 29 – Copper coins are minted in Japan for the first time (Traditional Japanese date: August 10, 708).

==== By topic ====
====== Medicine ======
- Tea drinking gains popularity among the Chinese. It is also valued for its alleged medicinal values (approximate date).

====== Religion ======
- January 15 – Pope Sisinnius succeeds Pope John VII as the 87th pope.
- March 25 – Pope Constantine I succeeds Pope Sisinnius as the 88th pope.
- Island Mont Tombe is dedicated to Michael and renamed Mont Saint-Michel.

=== 709 ===
==== By place ====
====== Byzantine Empire ======
- June – Emperor Justinian II sends a punitive expedition to Italy under the patrikios Theodore, to intervene in the dispute between Pope Constantine I and Archbishop Felix of Ravenna, who claims to be independent of the pope's authority. Theodore captures Ravenna, and arrests Felix and other Italian leaders. He deports them to Constantinople, from whence they are exiled to Cherson (Crimea).

====== Britain ======
- Ceolred becomes king of Mercia, after his cousin Coenred abdicates the throne. Dynastic rivalries lead to the banishment of his second cousin, prince Æthelbald, who flees to the East Anglian controlled Crowland Fens.
- Kings Swæfred and Sigeheard of Essex share power with Offa. He abdicates the throne in order to become a monk in Rome, along with Coenred. Saelred rules jointly with Swæfberht the sub-kingdom of Middlesex.

====== Arabian Empire ======
- Arab–Byzantine War: An Umayyad army under Maslamah ibn Abd al-Malik raids Isauria (modern Turkey). He is appointed military governor of Armenia and Azerbaijan, succeeding his uncle Muhammad ibn Marwan.
- After two years of failed efforts, Qutayba ibn Muslim captures Bukhara (Uzbekistan) for the Umayyad Caliphate. The Hephthalite princes of Tokharistan rebel against the Arabs, but are swiftly subdued by Qutayba.

==== By topic ====
====== Architecture, real estate ======
- Mont Saint-Michel, built by Aubert, bishop of Avranches, has its beginnings in an oratory on Mont Tombe, on the coast of Normandy (approximate date).

====== Environmental change ======
- A storm separates the Channel Islands of Jethou and Herm.

== Significant people ==
- Abd al-Malik
- Al-Walid I
- Abd al-Aziz ibn Marwan
- Justinian II

== Births ==
700

- Abu Muslim Khorasani, Muslim general (approximate date)
- Adrian I, pope of the Catholic Church (d. 795)
- Dōkyō, Japanese Buddhist monk (d. 772)
- Gaubald, bishop of Regensburg (approximate date)
- Gregory of Utrecht, Frankish abbot (approximate date)
- Ja'far al-Sadiq, Shī‘ah Imām and scholar (or 702)
- Kim Daeseong, Korean minister (d. 774)
- Paul I, pope of the Catholic Church (d. 767)
- Pirmin, Visigothic abbot (approximate date)
- Emperor Shōmu, Emperor in Japan (d. 756)
- Vergilius, bishop of Salzburg (approximate date)
- Wasil ibn Ata, Muslim theologian (d. 748)
- Willibald, bishop of Eichstätt (approximate date)

701

- May 19 – Li Bai (or Li Po), Chinese poet (d. 762)
- September 22 – Shōmu, emperor of Japan (d. 756)
- Kōmyō, empress of Japan (d. 760)
- Yazid III, Muslim caliph (d. 744)

702

- Ja'far al-Sadiq, sixth Shī‘ah Imām and Muslim scholar (d. 765)
- Ōnakatomi no Kiyomaro, Japanese nobleman (d. 788)

703

- An Lushan, Chinese rebel leader (approximate date)
- Shi Siming, general of the Tang Dynasty (d. 761)

704

- Cui Hao, Chinese poet (d. 754)
- Fujiwara no Toyonari, Japanese statesman (d. 765)
- Gao Shi, Chinese poet (approximate date)
- Hyecho, Korean Buddhist monk (d. 787)
- Ibn Ishaq, Arab historian and hagiographer
- Li Fuguo, Chinese official (d. 762)
- Me Agtsom, emperor of Tibet (d. 755)

705

- Amoghavajra, Chinese translator (d. 774)
- Sturm, abbot of Fulda (approximate date)
- Thingfrith, Earl of Mercia (approximate date)
- Tiberius, son of Justinian II (d. 711)

706

- Al-Walid II, Muslim caliph (d. 744)
- Eoppa, king of Wessex (d. 781)
- Fujiwara no Nakamaro, Japanese statesman (d. 764)
- Han Gan, Chinese painter (d. 783)
- Theudoald, nephew of the Frankish ruler Charles Martel (d. 741)

707

- Abd al-Rahman al-Awza'i, Muslim scholar (d. 774)
- Theudoald, mayor of the palace of Austrasia (or 708)

708

- Theudoald, mayor of the palace of Austrasia (or 707)
- Yuthog Yontan Gonpo, Tibetan high priest (lama) (d. 833)

709

- November 18 – Kōnin, emperor of Japan (d. 782)
- Du Hongjian, chancellor of the Tang Dynasty (d. 769)
- Liu Zhangqing, Chinese poet (d. 785)
- Mazu Daoyi, Chinese Zen Buddhist monk (d. 788)
- Yan Zhenqing, Chinese calligrapher (d. 785)
- Yaxun B'alam IV, king of Yaxchilan (Mexico) (d. 768)
- Zhang Xun, general of the Tang Dynasty (d. 757)

== Deaths ==
700

- Asuka, Japanese princess
- Cunipert, king of the Lombards
- Di Renjie, official of the Tang dynasty (b. 630)
- Disibod, Irish monk and hermit (b. 619)
- Dōshō, Japanese Buddhist monk (b. 629)
- Fiannamail ua Dúnchado, king of Dál Riata
- Godeberta, Frankish abbess (approximate date)
- Hassan ibn al-Nu'man, Muslim emir (general)
- Osgyth, Anglo-Saxon abbess and saint
- Reineldis, Frankish saint (approximate date)
- Asparuh of Bulgaria, founder of the country of Bulgaria

701

- September 8 – Pope Sergius I
- October 8 – Prince Yide (Li Chongrun), prince of the Tang dynasty, probable forced suicide (b. 682)
- October 9 – Princess Yongtai (Li Xianhui), princess of the Tang dynasty, probable forced suicide (b. 685)
- Asparuh, ruler of the First Bulgarian Empire
- Egica, king of the Visigoths (or 703)
- Raginpert, usurping king of the Lombards
- Yŏn Namsan, military leader of Goguryeo (b. 639)

702

- Al-Muhallab ibn Abi Sufra, Arab general and governor of Basra
- Berlinda of Meerbeke, Frankish nun and saint (approximate date)
- Chen Zi'ang, Chinese poet and official of the Tang dynasty (b. 661)
- Kʼinich Kan Bahlam II, ruler of Palenque (b. 635)
- Liutpert, king of the Lombards
- Muiredach Muillethan, king of Connacht (Ireland)
- Ōku, Japanese princess (b. 661)

703

- January 13 – Jitō, empress of Japan (b. 645)
- March 20 – Wulfram, archbishop of Sens
- Ergica, king of the Visigoths (or 701)
- Ermenilda of Ely, Anglo-Saxon abbess (approximate date)
- Loingsech mac Óengusso, high king of Ireland
- Thrasimund I, duke (dux) of Spoleto

704

- December 14 – Aldfrith, king of Northumbria (or 705)
- Abd al-Rahman ibn Muhammad ibn al-Ash'ath, Arab rebel leader
- Adomnán, Irish abbot and hagiographer (b. c.624)
- Tridu Songtsen, emperor of Tibet (b. 670)

705

- January 11 – Pope John VI
- October 8 – Abd al-Malik ibn Marwan, Muslim caliph (b. 646)
- December 16 – Wu Zetian, Empress of the Zhou Dynasty (b. 624)
- Aldfrith, king of Northumbria (or 704)
- Bosa, bishop of York (approximate date)
- Cellach mac Rogallaig, king of Connacht (Ireland)
- Hædde, bishop of Winchester (approximate date)
- Heraclius, Byzantine general (monostrategos)
- Kallinikos I, patriarch of Constantinople (or 706)
- Lambert of Maastricht, bishop (approximate date)
- Varaz Trdat I, king of Caucasian Albania
- Azza al-Mayla, Arabian qiyan-courtesan singer (approximate date)

706

- February 15 – Leontios, Byzantine emperor
- February 15 – Tiberios III, Byzantine emperor
- Gisulf I, duke of Benevento
- Kallinikos I, patriarch of Constantinople (or 705)
- Shenxiu, Chinese Zen Buddhist patriarch
- Zhang Jianzhi, official of the Tang dynasty (b. 625)

707

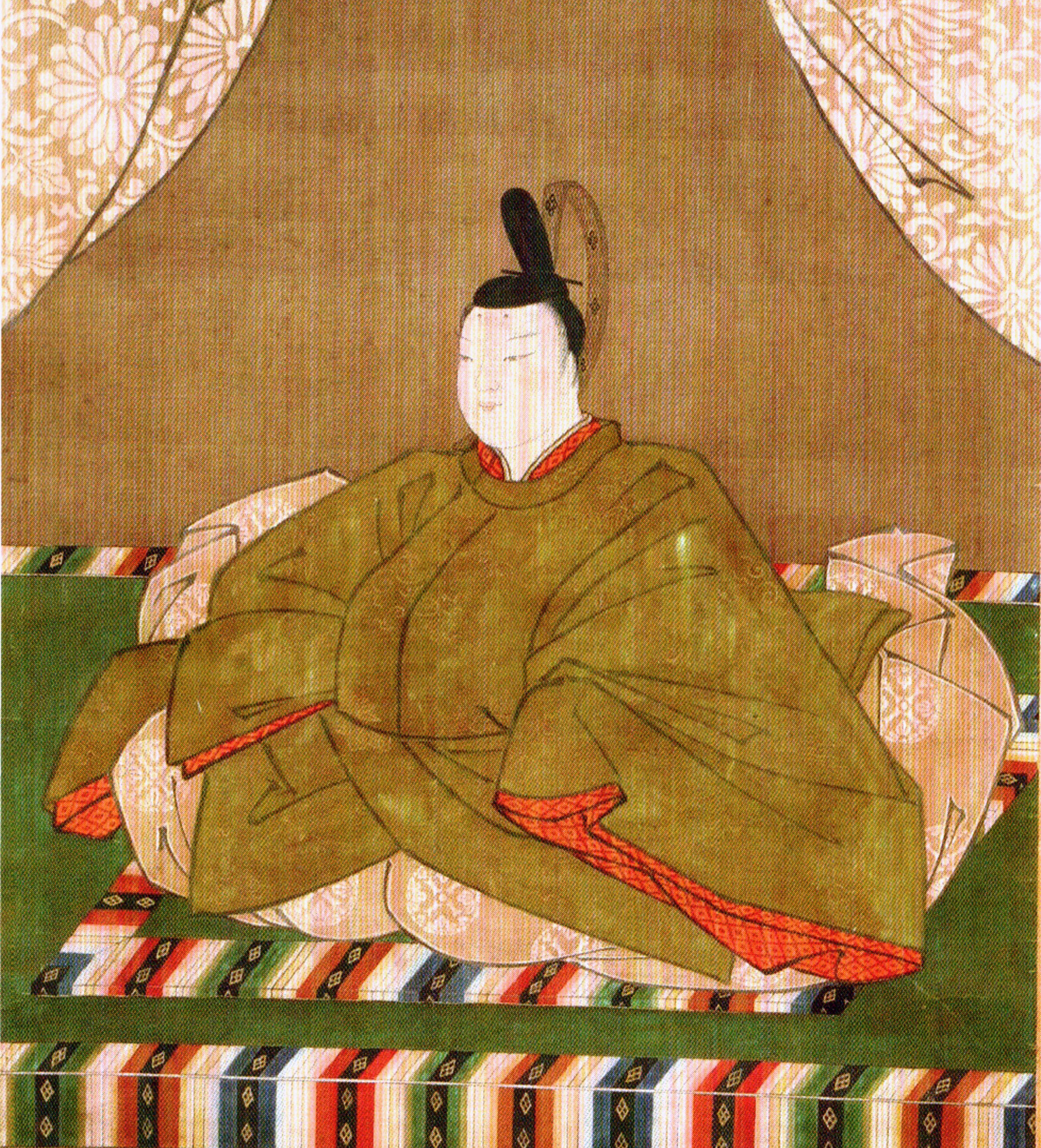
Emperor Monmu

- August 7 – Li Chongjun, crown prince of the Tang dynasty

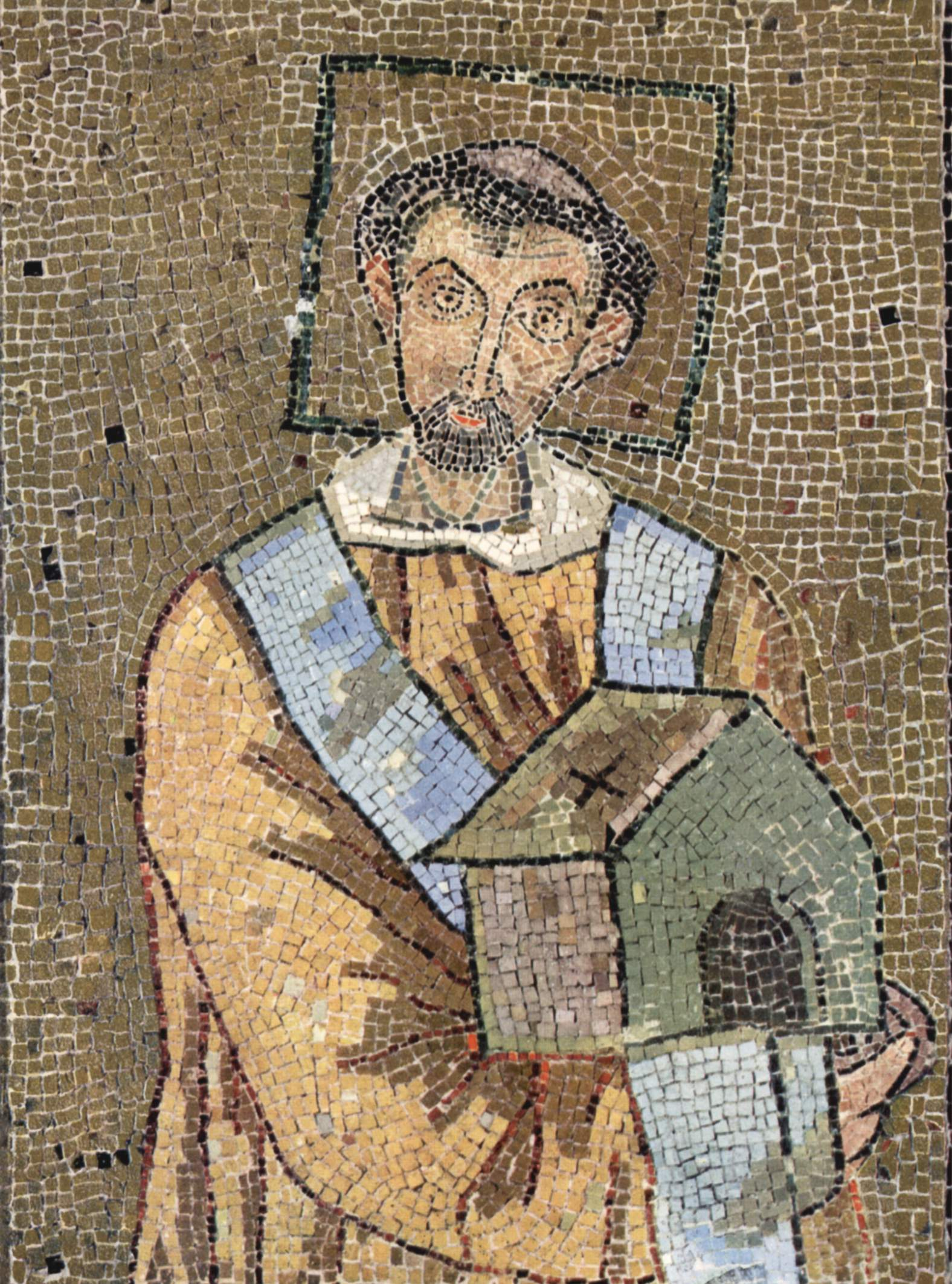
Pope John XII

- Abbo II, bishop of Metz (approximate date)
- Hidulf, bishop of Trier (approximate date)
- John Maron, Syriac monk and patriarch (b. 628)
- Li Duozuo, general of the Tang dynasty
- Wu Sansi, official of the Tang dynasty

708

- February 4 – Sisinnius, pope of the Catholic Church
- June 5 – Jacob of Edessa, Syriac writer
- Abd-Allah ibn Ibadh, Muslim jurist and imam
- Drogo, duke of Champagne (b. 670)
- Julian II the Roman, Syriac Orthodox Patriarch of Antioch.

709

- May 25 – Aldhelm, bishop of Sherborne
- Æthelred, king of Mercia (approximate date)
- Bertin, Frankish abbot (approximate date)
- Gotfrid, duke of Alemannia (approximate date)
- Swæfred, king of Essex (approximate date)
- Wilfrid, Anglo-Saxon bishop (or 710)
