= 708 =

Calendar year

708 in various calendars
Gregorian calendar	708; DCCVIII
Ab urbe condita	1461
Armenian calendar	157; ԹՎ ՃԾԷ
Assyrian calendar	5458
Balinese saka calendar	629–630
Bengali calendar	114–115
Berber calendar	1658
Buddhist calendar	1252
Burmese calendar	70
Byzantine calendar	6216–6217
Chinese calendar	丁未年 (Fire Goat); 3405 or 3198 — to — 戊申年 (Earth Monkey); 3406 or 3199
Coptic calendar	424–425
Discordian calendar	1874
Ethiopian calendar	700–701
Hebrew calendar	4468–4469
- Hindu calendars
Vikram Samvat	764–765
Shaka Samvat	629–630
Kali Yuga	3808–3809
Holocene calendar	10708
Iranian calendar	86–87
Islamic calendar	89–90
Japanese calendar	Keiun 5 / Wadō 1 (和銅元年)
Javanese calendar	600–602
Julian calendar	708; DCCVIII
Korean calendar	3041
Minguo calendar	1204 before ROC 民前1204年
Nanakshahi calendar	−760
Seleucid era	1019/1020 AG
Thai solar calendar	1250–1251
Tibetan calendar	མེ་མོ་ལུག་ལོ་ (female Fire-Sheep); 834 or 453 or −319 — to — ས་ཕོ་སྤྲེ་ལོ་ (male Earth-Monkey); 835 or 454 or −318

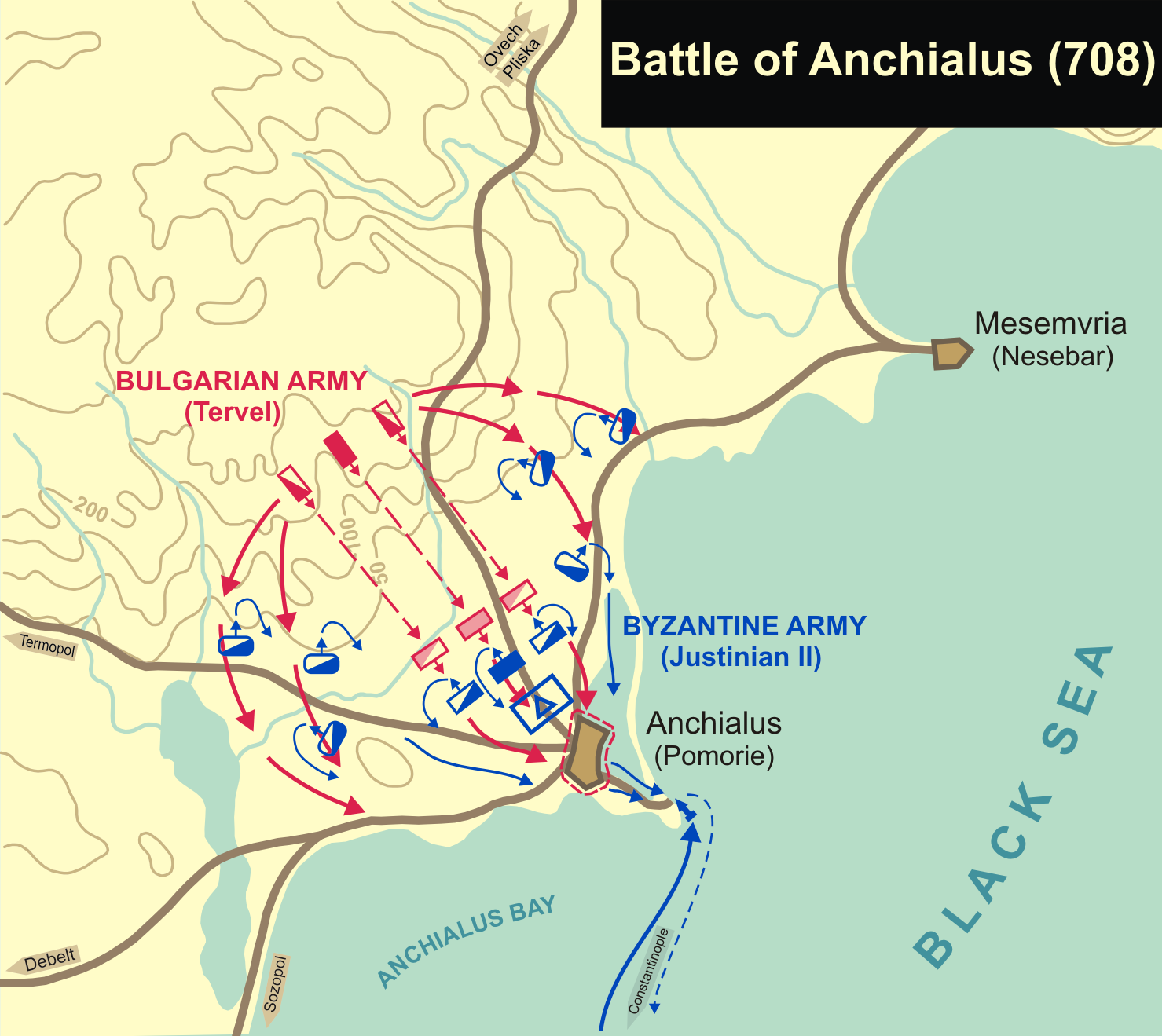
Battle of Anchialus (708)

Year 708 (DCCVIII) was a leap year starting on Sunday of the Julian calendar, the 708th year of the Common Era (CE) and Anno Domini (AD) designations, the 708th year of the 1st millennium, the 8th year of the 8th century, and the 9th year of the 700s decade. The denomination 708 for this year has been used since the early medieval period, when the Anno Domini calendar era became the prevalent method in Europe for naming years.

== Events ==
=== By place ===
==== Byzantine Empire ====
- Arab–Byzantine War: The Umayyads under Maslamah ibn Abd al-Malik capture and sack the Byzantine city of Tyana (Cappadocia) after a prolonged siege, and following a victory over a Byzantine relief army. Maslamah also leads another expedition in the summer, raiding and conquering Amorium (modern Turkey).

==== Europe ====
- Battle of Anchialus: A Byzantine expeditionary force under Emperor Justinian II is defeated near the seaside city of Anchialus, on the Black Sea Coast. The Byzantines are overwhelmed by a surprise attack of Bulgarian cavalry, led by Tervel. Justinian manages to reach the fortress, and escapes to Constantinople on a ship.

==== Asia ====
- Nazaktar Khan, a Turk Shahi prince in alliance with the Tibetan Empire, captures Bactria from the Umayyads.
- August 29 – Copper coins are minted in Japan for the first time (Traditional Japanese date: August 10, 708).

=== By topic ===
==== Medicine ====
- Tea drinking gains popularity among the Chinese. It is also valued for its alleged medicinal values (approximate date).

==== Religion ====
- January 15 – Pope Sisinnius succeeds Pope John VII as the 87th pope.
- March 25 – Pope Constantine I succeeds Pope Sisinnius as the 88th pope.
- Island Mont Tombe is dedicated to Michael and renamed Mont Saint-Michel.

== Births ==
- Theudoald, mayor of the palace of Austrasia (or 707)
- Yuthog Yontan Gonpo, Tibetan high priest (lama) (d. 833)

== Deaths ==
- February 4 – Sisinnius, pope of the Catholic Church
- June 5 – Jacob of Edessa, Syriac writer
- Abd-Allah ibn Ibadh, Muslim jurist and imam
- Drogo, duke of Champagne (b. 670)
- Julian II the Roman, Syriac Orthodox Patriarch of Antioch.
