= 705 =

Calendar year

705 in various calendars
Gregorian calendar	705; DCCV
Ab urbe condita	1458
Armenian calendar	154; ԹՎ ՃԾԴ
Assyrian calendar	5455
Balinese saka calendar	626–627
Bengali calendar	111–112
Berber calendar	1655
Buddhist calendar	1249
Burmese calendar	67
Byzantine calendar	6213–6214
Chinese calendar	甲辰年 (Wood Dragon); 3402 or 3195 — to — 乙巳年 (Wood Snake); 3403 or 3196
Coptic calendar	421–422
Discordian calendar	1871
Ethiopian calendar	697–698
Hebrew calendar	4465–4466
- Hindu calendars
Vikram Samvat	761–762
Shaka Samvat	626–627
Kali Yuga	3805–3806
Holocene calendar	10705
Iranian calendar	83–84
Islamic calendar	85–87
Japanese calendar	Keiun 2 (慶雲２年)
Javanese calendar	597–598
Julian calendar	705; DCCV
Korean calendar	3038
Minguo calendar	1207 before ROC 民前1207年
Nanakshahi calendar	−763
Seleucid era	1016/1017 AG
Thai solar calendar	1247–1248
Tibetan calendar	ཤིང་ཕོ་འབྲུག་ལོ་ (male Wood-Dragon); 831 or 450 or −322 — to — ཤིང་མོ་སྦྲུལ་ལོ་ (female Wood-Snake); 832 or 451 or −321

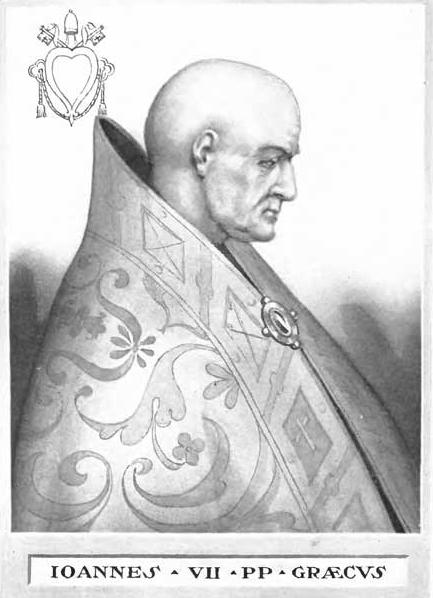
Pope John VII (705–707)

Year 705 (DCCV) was a common year starting on Thursday of the Julian calendar, the 705th year of the Common Era (CE) and Anno Domini (AD) designations, the 705th year of the 1st millennium, the 5th year of the 8th century, and the 6th year of the 700s decade. The denomination 705 for this year has been used since the early medieval period, when the Anno Domini calendar era became the prevalent method in Europe for naming years.

== Events ==
=== By place ===
==== Byzantine Empire ====
- Spring – An army of 15,000 Bulgar and Slav horsemen under Justinian II appear before the walls of Constantinople. After three days, his troops discover an unused water conduit under the walls of the city, and enter through the Valens Aqueduct. Hearing that Justinian has taken control of the Blachernae Palace, Emperor Tiberios III flees to Bithynia (modern Turkey), where he evades capture for several months.
- Justinian II ascends to the throne again and rewards his ally Tervel, ruler (khagan) of the Bulgarian Empire, for his assistance with the title of kaisar (Caesar), which makes him second only to Justinian and the first foreign ruler in Byzantine history to receive such a title, and a territorial concession in northeastern Thrace, a region called Zagora in modern-day Bulgaria.

==== Europe ====
- Duke Gisulf I of Benevento captures the cities of Sora, Arpino, and Arce (Central Italy). He marches as far as Horrea, plundering and burning, before he is confronted with gifts by the ambassadors of Pope John VI, who ransom many of his captives.

==== Britain ====
- King Ine of Wessex becomes estranged from the kings Sigeheard and Swæfred of Essex, who are sheltering exiled rivals to the Wessex throne. At a council at Brentford, the latter agree to banish the exiles in return for Ine not attacking their kingdom.
- Prince Osred of Northumbria, assisted by ealdorman, defeats the usurper Eadwulf I. He becomes king at the age of nine; the government is controlled by the powerful bishop Wilfrid.
- King Geraint of Dumnonia grants land at Maker (Cornwall) to Sherborne Abbey, in an attempt to strengthen his position in the disputed regions of Dorset (approximate date).

==== Arabian Empire ====
- Arab forces gain power in Central Asia, as Qutayba ibn Muslim becomes governor of Khorasan. The region has grown rich from trade with China and Eastern Europe, its merchants dealing in silk, furs, amber, honey, and walrus ivory. During his rule, Qutayba subjugates the mercantile cities of Bukhara and Samarkand (modern Uzbekistan), as well as the Oxus delta area of Khwarezm, south of the Aral Sea.
- October 8 – Caliph Abd al-Malik ibn Marwan dies in his winter resort at Al-Sinnabra (Palestine), after a 20-year reign. During his rule, the financial administration of the Umayyad Caliphate has been reorganized. Arab coins have replaced former Byzantine and Sassanian coins, and regular postal service has been established between Damascus and the provincial capitals. Abd al-Malik is succeeded by his son Al-Walid I.
- Arab conquest of Armenia: Large-scale Armenian rebellion is suppressed by Muhammad ibn Marwan. He captures and deports Smbat VI Bagratuni and other leading princes. Many of the captured nakharar are gathered into churches and burned alive at Nakhchevan (modern Azerbaijan).
- Arab general Musa ibn Nusayr conquers the city of Tlemcen in Algeria; once and for all solidifying Al-Maghreb Al-Awsat (Modern-day Algeria), which makes way for the stabilization of the entirety of North Africa a couple years later.

==== Asia ====
- February 22 – Empress Wu Zetian is deposed in a coup d'état organized by her chancellor Zhang Jianzhi, after a 15-year reign. His chief ministers gain support from some generals to seize the imperial palace and execute the Zhang brothers. They reinstall her son Zhong Zong, whom she deposed 15 years ago, restoring the Tang dynasty. This marks the end of the short-lived Zhou dynasty in China.
- Nishiyama Onsen Keiunkan, a hot spring hotel, is founded in Hayakawa, Yamanashi Prefecture, Japan. It is the oldest hotel in the world and has been operated by the same family for 52 generations.

=== By topic ===
==== Religion ====
- January 11 – Pope John VI dies at Rome, after a reign of little more than 3 years. During his rule, he protected the Byzantine exarch Theophylactus, when he invaded the Italian mainland from Sicily. He also induced Gisulf I, Lombard duke of Benevento, to withdraw from Byzantine territory, ransomed captives and ordered the restoration of Wilfrid, as deposed bishop of York. He is succeeded by John VII as the 86th pope of the Catholic Church.
- Al-Walid I commissions the construction of Al-Aqsa Mosque located in the Old City of Jerusalem (approximate date).

== Births ==
- Amoghavajra, Chinese translator (d. 774)
- Sturm, abbot of Fulda (approximate date)
- Thingfrith, Earl of Mercia (approximate date)
- Tiberius, son of Justinian II (d. 711)

== Deaths ==
- January 11 – Pope John VI
- October 8 – Abd al-Malik ibn Marwan, Muslim caliph (b. 646)
- December 16 – Wu Zetian, Empress of the Zhou Dynasty (b. 624)
- Aldfrith, king of Northumbria (or 704)
- Bosa, bishop of York (approximate date)
- Cellach mac Rogallaig, king of Connacht (Ireland)
- Hædde, bishop of Winchester (approximate date)
- Heraclius, Byzantine general (monostrategos)
- Kallinikos I, patriarch of Constantinople (or 706)
- Lambert of Maastricht, bishop (approximate date)
- Varaz Trdat I, king of Caucasian Albania
- Azza al-Mayla, Arabian qiyan-courtesan singer (approximate date)
