= AD 707 =

Calendar year

707 in various calendars
Gregorian calendar	707; DCCVII
Ab urbe condita	1460
Armenian calendar	156; ԹՎ ՃԾԶ
Assyrian calendar	5457
Balinese saka calendar	628–629
Bengali calendar	113–114
Berber calendar	1657
Buddhist calendar	1251
Burmese calendar	69
Byzantine calendar	6215–6216
Chinese calendar	丙午年 (Fire Horse); 3404 or 3197 — to — 丁未年 (Fire Goat); 3405 or 3198
Coptic calendar	423–424
Discordian calendar	1873
Ethiopian calendar	699–700
Hebrew calendar	4467–4468
- Hindu calendars
Vikram Samvat	763–764
Shaka Samvat	628–629
Kali Yuga	3807–3808
Holocene calendar	10707
Iranian calendar	85–86
Islamic calendar	88–89
Japanese calendar	Keiun 4 (慶雲４年)
Javanese calendar	599–600
Julian calendar	707; DCCVII
Korean calendar	3040
Minguo calendar	1205 before ROC 民前1205年
Nanakshahi calendar	−761
Seleucid era	1018/1019 AG
Thai solar calendar	1249–1250
Tibetan calendar	མེ་ཕོ་རྟ་ལོ་ (male Fire-Horse); 833 or 452 or −320 — to — མེ་མོ་ལུག་ལོ་ (female Fire-Sheep); 834 or 453 or −319

Map of the Arab-Byzantine frontier (8th century)

Year 707 (DCCVII) was a common year starting on Saturday of the Julian calendar. The denomination 707 for this year has been used since the early medieval period, when the Anno Domini calendar era became the prevalent method in Europe for naming years.

== Events ==
=== By place ===
==== Byzantine Empire ====
- Arab–Byzantine War: An Umayyad army under Maslamah ibn Abd al-Malik invades Asia Minor, and lays siege to Tyana (Cappadocia). The fortress city resists, dragging the siege through the winter and into 708.

==== Arabian Empire ====
- The Muslim-Arabs conquer the Balearic Islands in the Mediterranean Sea (approximate date).
- The first Islamic hospital (bimaristan) is founded in Damascus (approximate date).

==== Asia ====
- July 18 – Emperor Monmu dies after a 10-year reign. He is succeeded by his aunt Genmei, who becomes the 43rd empress of Japan. She is the sister of former empress Jitō, and the niece and wife of late emperor Tenmu.

=== By topic ===
==== Religion ====
- October 18 – Pope John VII dies at Rome after a 19-month reign. A prolonged sede vacante exists, until the ratification of the election of Sisinnius by the Exarch of Ravenna, in early 708.

== Births ==
- Abd al-Rahman al-Awza'i, Muslim scholar (d. 774)
- Theudoald, mayor of the palace of Austrasia (or 708)

== Deaths ==
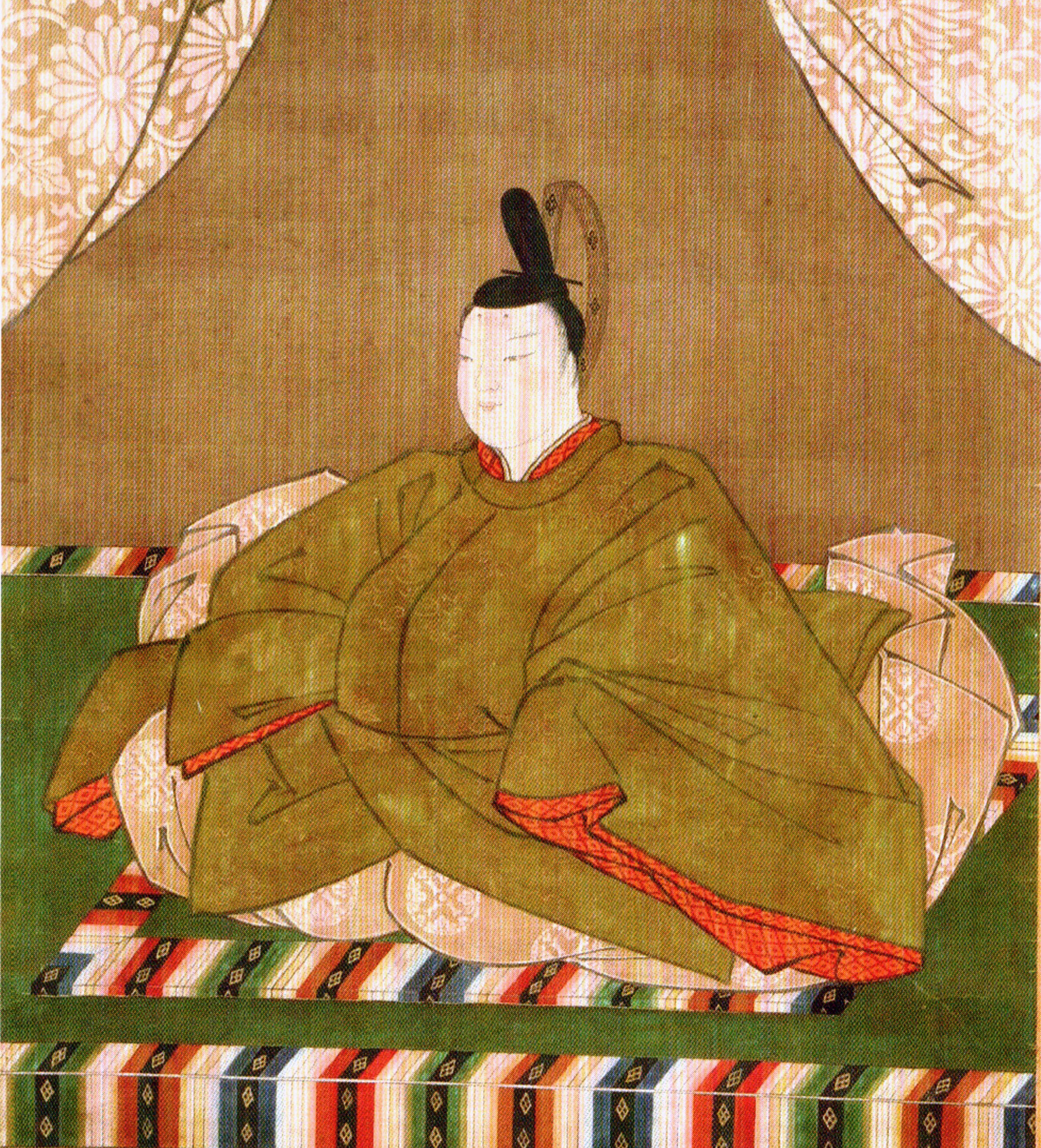
Emperor Monmu

- August 7 – Li Chongjun, crown prince of the Tang dynasty

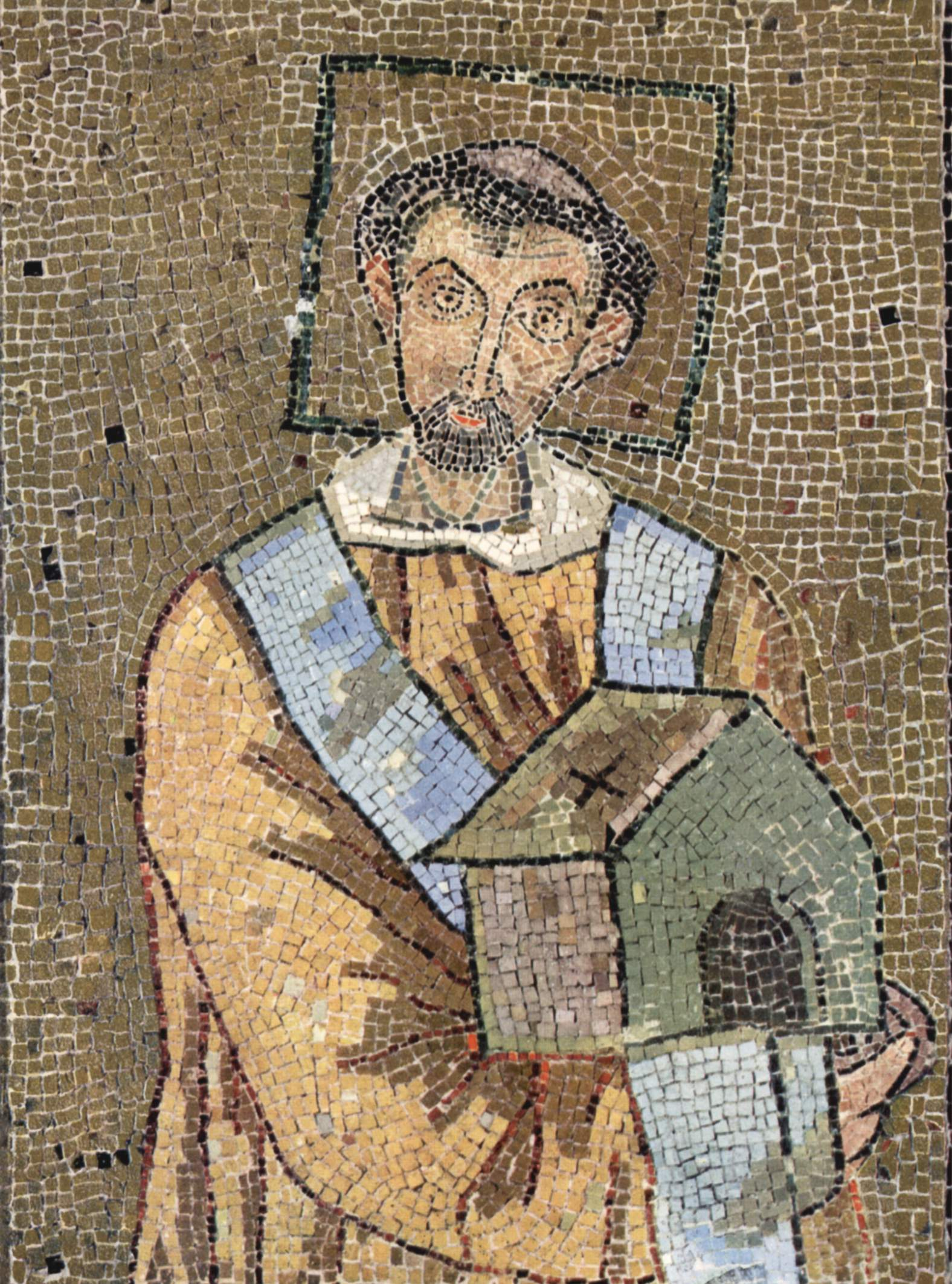
Pope John XII

- Abbo II, bishop of Metz (approximate date)
- Hidulf, bishop of Trier (approximate date)
- John Maron, Syriac monk and patriarch (b. 628)
- Li Duozuo, general of the Tang dynasty
- Wu Sansi, official of the Tang dynasty
