= 701 =

Calendar year

701 in various calendars
Gregorian calendar	701; DCCI
Ab urbe condita	1454
Armenian calendar	150; ԹՎ ՃԾ
Assyrian calendar	5451
Balinese saka calendar	622–623
Bengali calendar	107–108
Berber calendar	1651
Buddhist calendar	1245
Burmese calendar	63
Byzantine calendar	6209–6210
Chinese calendar	庚子年 (Metal Rat); 3398 or 3191 — to — 辛丑年 (Metal Ox); 3399 or 3192
Coptic calendar	417–418
Discordian calendar	1867
Ethiopian calendar	693–694
Hebrew calendar	4461–4462
- Hindu calendars
Vikram Samvat	757–758
Shaka Samvat	622–623
Kali Yuga	3801–3802
Holocene calendar	10701
Iranian calendar	79–80
Islamic calendar	81–82
Japanese calendar	Shuchō 16 / Taihō 1 (大宝元年)
Javanese calendar	593–594
Julian calendar	701; DCCI
Korean calendar	3034
Minguo calendar	1211 before ROC 民前1211年
Nanakshahi calendar	−767
Seleucid era	1012/1013 AG
Thai solar calendar	1243–1244
Tibetan calendar	ལྕགས་ཕོ་བྱི་བ་ལོ་ (male Iron-Rat); 827 or 446 or −326 — to — ལྕགས་མོ་གླང་ལོ་ (female Iron-Ox); 828 or 447 or −325

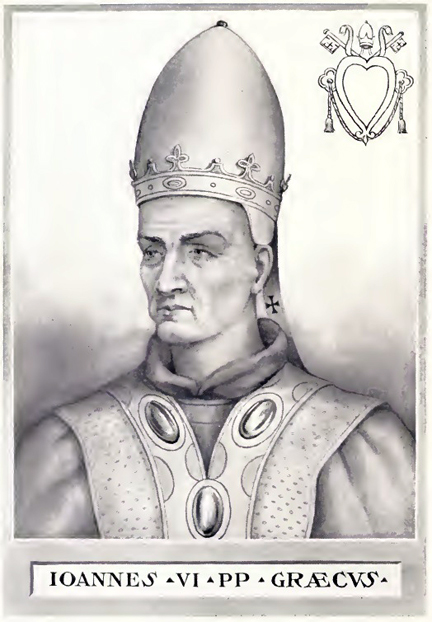
Pope John VI (701–705)

Year 701 (DCCI) was a common year starting on Saturday of the Julian calendar, the 701st year of the Common Era (CE) and Anno Domini (AD) designations, the 701st year of the 1st millennium, the 1st year of the 8th century, and the 2nd year of the 700s decade. The denomination 701 for this year has been used since the early medieval period, when the Anno Domini calendar era became the prevalent method in Europe for naming years.

== Events ==
=== By place ===
==== Europe ====
- Raginpert dies, and King Liutpert (succeeded and deposed in 700) returns to the throne of the Lombards. Raginpert's son Aripert captures Liutpert at his capital in Pavia, and will have him strangled in his bath. Aripert becomes new ruler of the Lombard Kingdom in Italy.
- King Egica dies, possibly assassinated in a plot led by Roderic. He is succeeded by his son Wittiza as king of the Visigoths (approximate date).

==== Balkans ====
- Asparuh, founder of the First Bulgarian Empire, dies after a 20-year reign. He is succeeded by his son Tervel, who becomes ruler (khan) of the Bulgarians.

==== Arabian Empire ====
- Battle of Dayr al-Jamajim: Caliph Abd al-Malik ibn Marwan sends Syrian troops to reinforce the Muslim army of Al-Hajjaj ibn Yusuf. He faces a 200,000-man army under Abd al-Rahman ibn Muhammad ibn al-Ash'ath near Kufa (modern Iraq). Al-Ash'ath is defeated, and his rebellion against the Umayyad Caliphate fails.
- Arab conquest of Armenia: Umayyad prince Muhammad ibn Marwan invades the Byzantine Armenian provinces east of the Euphrates; local commander Baanes surrenders before a large Arab army, and the population accepts a Muslim governor.
- Muslims from the Arabian Peninsula destroy the then-Axum-controlled port of Adulis, thus causing the decline of Ethiopian Christianity on the African Red Sea coast (approximate date).
- Arab merchants introduce Oriental spices into Mediterranean markets. Muslim merchant vessels visit the Maluku Islands (South East Asia) for the first time (approximate date).

==== Japan ====
- The Gagakuryo (Bureau of Court Music) is formed at the Imperial Court in Kyoto. Numerous types of music and dance are performed.
- Emperor Monmu becomes sole proprietor of all the nation's land, through a codification of political law (Code of Taihō).

=== By topic ===
==== Religion ====
- September 8 – Pope Sergius I dies at Rome after a 14-year reign. He is succeeded by John VI as the 85th pope of the Catholic Church.

== Births ==
- May 19 – Li Bai (or Li Po), Chinese poet (d. 762)
- September 22 – Shōmu, emperor of Japan (d. 756)
- Kōmyō, empress of Japan (d. 760)
- Yazid III, Muslim caliph (d. 744)

== Deaths ==
- September 8 – Pope Sergius I
- October 8 – Prince Yide (Li Chongrun), prince of the Tang dynasty, probable forced suicide (b. 682)
- October 9 – Princess Yongtai (Li Xianhui), princess of the Tang dynasty, probable forced suicide (b. 685)
- Asparuh, ruler of the First Bulgarian Empire
- Egica, king of the Visigoths (or 703)
- Raginpert, usurping king of the Lombards
- Yŏn Namsan, military leader of Goguryeo (b. 639)
