= Abbo of Metz =

Abbo of Metz may refer to two bishops of the Diocese of Metz:

- Goeric of Metz (also known as Abbo I of Metz), bishop from 627 to 643 AD
- Abbo II of Metz, bishop from 697 to 707 AD
