= 703 =

Calendar year

703 in various calendars
Gregorian calendar	703; DCCIII
Ab urbe condita	1456
Armenian calendar	152; ԹՎ ՃԾԲ
Assyrian calendar	5453
Balinese saka calendar	624–625
Bengali calendar	109–110
Berber calendar	1653
Buddhist calendar	1247
Burmese calendar	65
Byzantine calendar	6211–6212
Chinese calendar	壬寅年 (Water Tiger); 3400 or 3193 — to — 癸卯年 (Water Rabbit); 3401 or 3194
Coptic calendar	419–420
Discordian calendar	1869
Ethiopian calendar	695–696
Hebrew calendar	4463–4464
- Hindu calendars
Vikram Samvat	759–760
Shaka Samvat	624–625
Kali Yuga	3803–3804
Holocene calendar	10703
Iranian calendar	81–82
Islamic calendar	83–84
Japanese calendar	Taihō 3 (大宝３年)
Javanese calendar	595–596
Julian calendar	703; DCCIII
Korean calendar	3036
Minguo calendar	1209 before ROC 民前1209年
Nanakshahi calendar	−765
Seleucid era	1014/1015 AG
Thai solar calendar	1245–1246
Tibetan calendar	ཆུ་ཕོ་སྟག་ལོ་ (male Water-Tiger); 829 or 448 or −324 — to — ཆུ་མོ་ཡོས་ལོ་ (female Water-Hare); 830 or 449 or −323

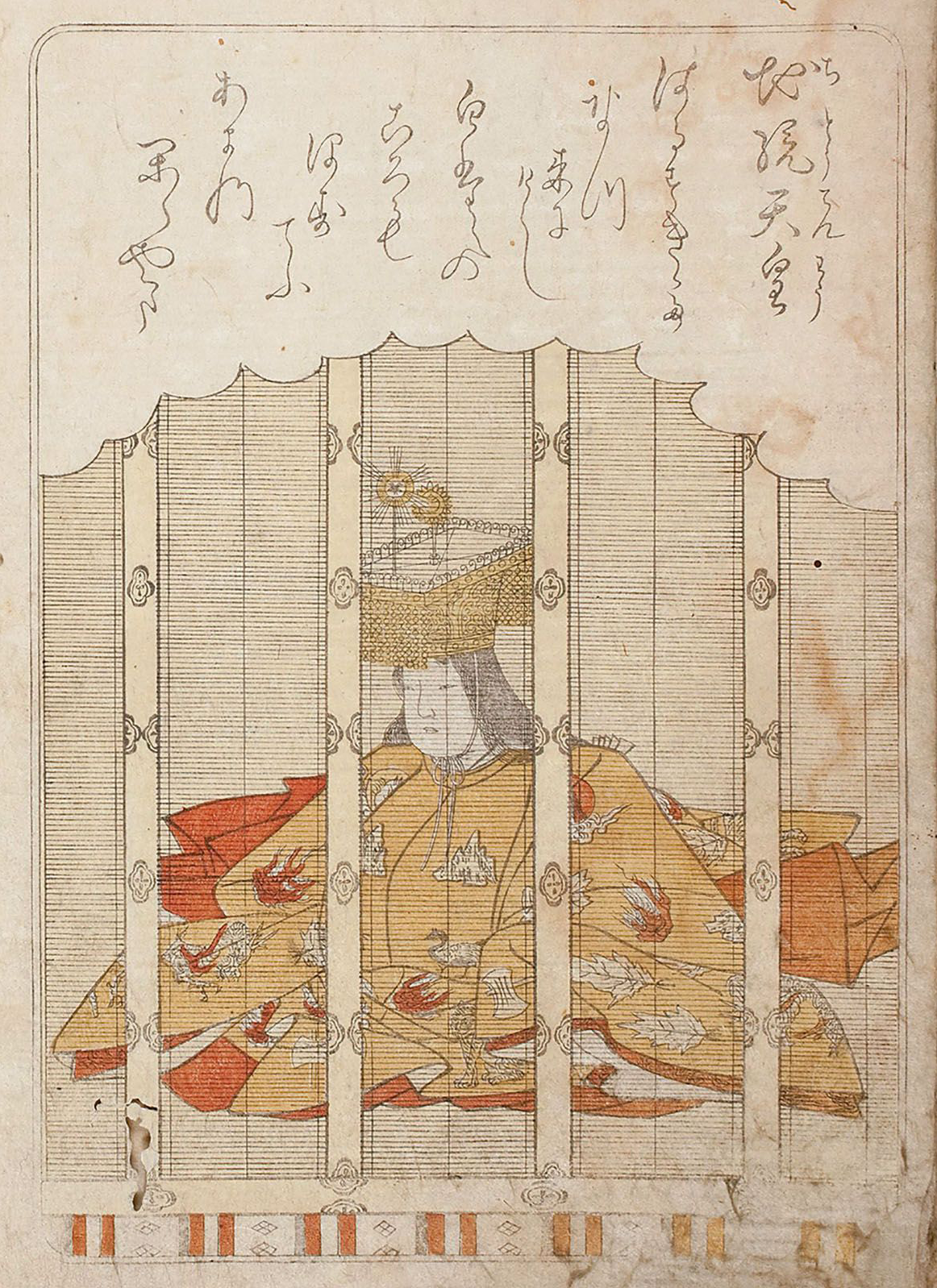
Empress Jitō of Japan (645–703)

Year 703 (DCCIII) was a common year starting on Monday of the Julian calendar, the 703rd year of the Common Era (CE) and Anno Domini (AD) designations, the 703rd year of the 1st millennium, the 3rd year of the 8th century, and the 4th year of the 700s decade. The denomination 703 for this year has been used sinc the early medieval period, when the Anno Domini calendar era became the prevalent method in Europe for naming years

== Events ==
=== By place ===
==== Byzantine Empire ====
- Arab–Byzantine War: The Umayyad army under Abdallah ibn Abd al-Malik captures Mopsuestia in Cilicia from the Byzantines, and refortifies it, making it the first major Muslim stronghold in the area that will later become the Thughur.
- Musa ibn Nusayr, governor of Ifriqiya (western Libya), builds a Muslim fleet to harass the Byzantine navy and conquer the islands of Ibiza, Mallorca, and Menorca (approximate date).

==== Europe ====
- Faroald II, duke of Spoleto, attacks the Exarchate of Ravenna in Italy, after the death of his father Thrasimund I. King Aripert II of the Lombards, desiring good relations with the Byzantine Empire and papacy, refuses to assist him.

==== Britain ====
- High King Loingsech mac Óengusso and his forces are routed during an invasion of Connacht (Ireland). He is killed by the men of King Cellach mac Rogallaig (approximate date).

=== By topic ===
==== Religion ====
- Wilfrid, Anglo-Saxon bishop, travels to Rome again, and is supported in his struggle to retain his see of York by the pope. On his way Wilfrid stops in Frisia (modern Netherlands), to visit Willibrord.
- Elias I becomes Catholicos of All Armenians.

== Births ==
- An Lushan, Chinese rebel leader (approximate date)
- Shi Siming, general of the Tang Dynasty (d. 761)

== Deaths ==
- January 13 – Jitō, empress of Japan (b. 645)
- March 20 – Wulfram, archbishop of Sens
- Ergica, king of the Visigoths (or 701)
- Ermenilda of Ely, Anglo-Saxon abbess (approximate date)
- Loingsech mac Óengusso, high king of Ireland
- Thrasimund I, duke (dux) of Spoleto
