= 704 =

Calendar year

704 in various calendars
- Gregorian calendar: 704; DCCIV
- Ab urbe condita: 1457
- Armenian calendar: 153; ԹՎ ՃԾԳ
- Assyrian calendar: 5454
- Balinese saka calendar: 625–626
- Bengali calendar: 110–111
- Berber calendar: 1654
- Buddhist calendar: 1248
- Burmese calendar: 66
- Byzantine calendar: 6212–6213
- Chinese calendar: 癸卯年 (Water Rabbit); 3401 or 3194 — to — 甲辰年 (Wood Dragon); 3402 or 3195
- Coptic calendar: 420–421
- Discordian calendar: 1870
- Ethiopian calendar: 696–697
- Hebrew calendar: 4464–4465
- Hindu calendars
- Vikram Samvat: 760–761
- Shaka Samvat: 625–626
- Kali Yuga: 3804–3805
- Holocene calendar: 10704
- Iranian calendar: 82–83
- Islamic calendar: 84–85
- Japanese calendar: Taihō 4 / Keiun 1 (慶雲元年)
- Javanese calendar: 596–597
- Julian calendar: 704; DCCIV
- Korean calendar: 3037
- Minguo calendar: 1208 before ROC 民前1208年
- Nanakshahi calendar: −764
- Seleucid era: 1015/1016 AG
- Thai solar calendar: 1246–1247
- Tibetan calendar: ཆུ་མོ་ཡོས་ལོ་ (female Water-Hare); 830 or 449 or −323 — to — ཤིང་ཕོ་འབྲུག་ལོ་ (male Wood-Dragon); 831 or 450 or −322

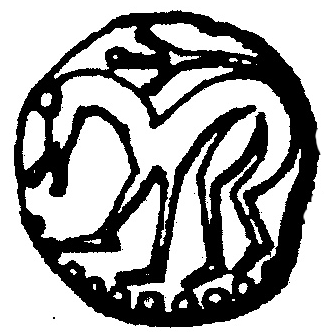
Lion symbol used on king Aldfrith's coinage

Year 704 (DCCIV) was a leap year starting on Tuesday of the Julian calendar, the 704th year of the Common Era (CE) and Anno Domini (AD) designations, the 704th year of the 1st millennium, the 4th year of the 8th century, and the 5th year of the 700s decade. The denomination 704 for this year has been used since the early medieval period, when the Anno Domini calendar era became the prevalent method in Europe for naming years.

== Events ==
=== By place ===
==== Byzantine Empire ====
- After spending nearly a decade with the Khazars (a Turkic tribe which controls a Steppe empire), the deposed emperor Justinian II flees from his exile at Cherson (Crimea). He escapes with help from Busir, ruler (khagan) of the Khazars, who marries him to his sister Theodora.
- Autumn – Emperor Tiberios III tries to bribe Busir and dispatches two Khazar officials, Papatzys and Balgitzin, to kill Justinian. Warned by his wife, he flees to the Bulgar Khanate, securing the assistance of the Bulgarian ruler Tervel, in exchange for financial considerations.
- Arab–Byzantine War: A Byzantine expeditionary force under Heraclius (brother of Tiberios III) defeats and destroys an Umayyad army (10,000 men) at Sisium (modern Turkey) under Yazid ibn Hunayn, killing most and leading the others off in chains to Constantinople.

==== Britain ====
- King Æthelred I abdicates the throne after a 30-year reign and becomes an abbot at Bardney (Lincolnshire). He is succeeded by his nephew Cenred (Coenred), a son of the late king Wulfhere, who becomes ruler of Mercia.
- December 14 – King Aldfrith of Northumbria dies after a 20-year reign. His throne is seized by Eadwulf I, of unknown descent. Wilfrid travels to Driffield to support Eadwulf, but his advances are rejected (approximate date).

==== Arabian Empire ====
- Arab conquest of Armenia: The Muslim Arabs under Abdallah ibn Abd al-Malik (a son of caliph Abd al-Malik ibn Marwan) invade Armenia and subdue the anti-Arab revolt along with his uncle Muhammad ibn Marwan.
- Winter – Abdallah ibn Abd al-Malik is recalled from Armenia to serve as governor of Egypt. He requires that government business be done in Arabic instead of Coptic. His tenure is marred by famine and corruption.

==== Asia ====
- Emperor Tridu Songtsen dies in battle, and is succeeded by his mother Khri ma lod, who becomes de facto ruler of the Tibetan Empire. She begins a massive expansion into the Tarim Basin and Northern China.

== Births ==
- Cui Hao, Chinese poet (d. 754)
- Fujiwara no Toyonari, Japanese statesman (d. 765)
- Gao Shi, Chinese poet (approximate date)
- Hyecho, Korean Buddhist monk (d. 787)
- Ibn Ishaq, Arab historian and hagiographer
- Li Fuguo, Chinese official (d. 762)
- Me Agtsom, emperor of Tibet (d. 755)

== Deaths ==
- December 14 – Aldfrith, king of Northumbria (or 705)
- Abd al-Rahman ibn Muhammad ibn al-Ash'ath, Arab rebel leader
- Adomnán, Irish abbot and hagiographer (b. c.624)
- Tridu Songtsen, emperor of Tibet (b. 670)
