= 700 =

Calendar year

700 in various calendars
- Gregorian calendar: 700; DCC
- Ab urbe condita: 1453
- Armenian calendar: 149; ԹՎ ՃԽԹ
- Assyrian calendar: 5450
- Balinese saka calendar: 621–622
- Bengali calendar: 106–107
- Berber calendar: 1650
- Buddhist calendar: 1244
- Burmese calendar: 62
- Byzantine calendar: 6208–6209
- Chinese calendar: 己亥年 (Earth Pig); 3397 or 3190 — to — 庚子年 (Metal Rat); 3398 or 3191
- Coptic calendar: 416–417
- Discordian calendar: 1866
- Ethiopian calendar: 692–693
- Hebrew calendar: 4460–4461
- Hindu calendars
- Vikram Samvat: 756–757
- Shaka Samvat: 621–622
- Kali Yuga: 3800–3801
- Holocene calendar: 10700
- Iranian calendar: 78–79
- Islamic calendar: 80–81
- Japanese calendar: Shuchō 15 (朱鳥１５年)
- Javanese calendar: 592–593
- Julian calendar: 700; DCC
- Korean calendar: 3033
- Minguo calendar: 1212 before ROC 民前1212年
- Nanakshahi calendar: −768
- Seleucid era: 1011/1012 AG
- Thai solar calendar: 1242–1243
- Tibetan calendar: ས་མོ་ཕག་ལོ་ (female Earth-Boar); 826 or 445 or −327 — to — ལྕགས་ཕོ་བྱི་བ་ལོ་ (male Iron-Rat); 827 or 446 or −326

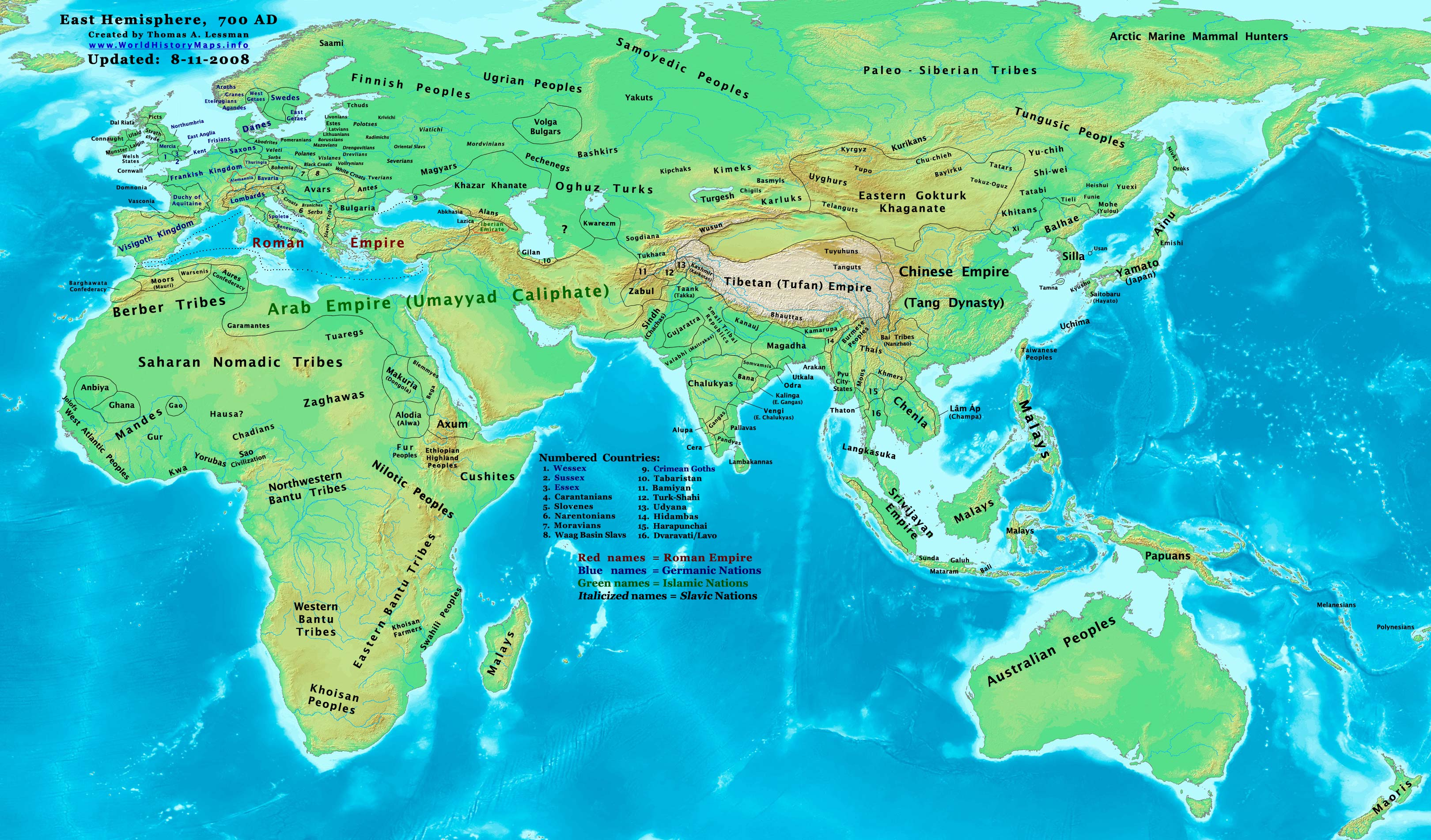
Eastern Hemisphere (700)

700 (DCC) was a leap year starting on Thursday of the Julian calendar, the 700th year of the Common Era (CE) and Anno Domini (AD) designations, the 700th year of the 1st millennium, the 100th and last year of the 7th century, and the 1st year of the 700s decade. As of the start of 700, the Gregorian calendar was 3 days ahead of the Julian calendar, which was the dominant calendar of the time.

The denomination 700 for this year has been used since the early medieval period, when the Anno Domini calendar era became the prevalent method in Europe for naming years.

== Events ==
=== By place ===
==== Byzantine Empire ====
- Avar and Slavic tribes conquer Byzantine territories in the Balkans, occupying lands as far south as the Peloponnese peninsula in southern Greece (approximate date).

==== Europe ====
- King Cunipert dies after a 12-year reign, and is succeeded by his son Liutpert. He rules the Lombard Kingdom together with Ansprand, duke of Asti, as regent.
- Raginpert, duke of Turin, deposes King Liutpert after an eight months' reign. He usurps the Lombard throne and puts his son Aripert in line for the succession.
- Pepin of Herstal, mayor of the palace, extends the Frankish Kingdom and annexes Thuringia. He turns the war towards the Alemanni (approximate date).

==== Britain ====
- King Geraint of Dumnonia receives a letter from Aldhelm, bishop of Sherborne, who insists that the Celtic Church comply with the doctrines of Rome.
- King Ine of Wessex begins to dispense with Wessex sub-kings and replace them with ealdormen (approximate date).
- The Eóganachta, an Irish dynasty centred around Cashel, begins to dominate southern Ireland (approximate date).
- Hamwic emerges as a major Wessex trading town (approximate date).

==== Arabian Empire ====
- Mohammad ibn al-Ash'ath revolts against Caliph Abd al-Malik ibn Marwan in the Sistan and Balochistan regions (Iran).
- The Umayyad prince Abdallah ibn Abd al-Malik captures the Byzantine stronghold of Theodosiopolis in Armenia.
- Musa ibn Nusayr defeats the Berber forces in Algeria, ending resistance against the Arabs (approximate date).
- The African slave trade through the Sahara is so extensive that the town of Zawila (Tunisia) is established.

==== Mesoamerica ====
- Maya civilization: Tikal Temple I, called the "Temple of the Giant Jaguar" (tomb of Jasaw Chan Kʼawiil I), Tikal, (Guatemala), is built.
- Diquis culture (modern Costa Rica) starts in Central America (approximate date).

==== North America ====
- The Mount Edziza volcanic complex erupts in northern British Columbia, Canada.

==== South America ====
- The Wariʼ people invade and occupy the Cuzco Valley (modern Peru) in the southern highlands (approximate date).
- The Moche culture in the northern part of modern day Peru collapses, largely due to environmental problems and/or political and social unrest (approximate date).

=== By topic ===
==== Art ====
- The Amida Buddha, a fresco in the kon-dō (Hōryū-ji Temple), is made (Nara period) (approximate date).

==== Religion ====
- Adomnán, Irish abbot, convinces 51 kings to adopt the Cáin Adomnáin, which defines the relationship between women and priests.
- Queen Cuthburh of Northumbria enters religious life. The Anglo-Saxon religious community at St. Mary's Nunnery is re-founded.
- Willibrord, Anglo-Saxon missionary, founds a mission post at Emmerich am Rhein (Germany), in the Utrecht Diocese.
- The Beverley Grammar School (East Yorkshire) is founded by bishop John of Beverley (approximate date).
- The Lindisfarne Gospels, an illuminated manuscript (Gospel Book), is produced in Northumbria.
- The famous Catholic Eucharistic Miracle occurs in Lanciano (Italy).

== Births ==
- Adrian I, pope of the Catholic Church (d. 795)
- Dōkyō, Japanese Buddhist monk (d. 772)
- Gaubald, bishop of Regensburg (approximate date)
- Gregory of Utrecht, Frankish abbot (approximate date)
- Ja'far al-Sadiq, Shī‘ah Imām and scholar (or 702)
- Kim Daeseong, Korean minister (d. 774)
- Paul I, pope of the Catholic Church (d. 767)
- Pirmin, Visigothic abbot (approximate date)
- Vergilius, bishop of Salzburg (approximate date)
- Willibald, bishop of Eichstätt (approximate date)

== Deaths ==
- February 3 - Werburgh, Anglo-Saxon princess
- November 11 - Di Renjie, official of the Tang dynasty (b. 630)
- Asuka, Japanese princess
- Cunipert, king of the Lombards
- Dōshō, Japanese Buddhist monk (b. 629)
- Fiannamail ua Dúnchado, king of Dál Riata
- Hassan ibn al-Nu'man, Muslim emir (general)
- Osgyth, Anglo-Saxon abbess and saint
- Asparuh of Bulgaria, founder of the country of Bulgaria
