= 774 =

Calendar year

774 in various calendars
Gregorian calendar	774; DCCLXXIV
Ab urbe condita	1527
Armenian calendar	223; ԹՎ ՄԻԳ
Assyrian calendar	5524
Balinese saka calendar	695–696
Bengali calendar	180–181
Berber calendar	1724
Buddhist calendar	1318
Burmese calendar	136
Byzantine calendar	6282–6283
Chinese calendar	癸丑年 (Water Ox); 3471 or 3264 — to — 甲寅年 (Wood Tiger); 3472 or 3265
Coptic calendar	490–491
Discordian calendar	1940
Ethiopian calendar	766–767
Hebrew calendar	4534–4535
- Hindu calendars
Vikram Samvat	830–831
Shaka Samvat	695–696
Kali Yuga	3874–3875
Holocene calendar	10774
Iranian calendar	152–153
Islamic calendar	157–158
Japanese calendar	Hōki 5 (宝亀５年)
Javanese calendar	669–670
Julian calendar	774; DCCLXXIV
Korean calendar	3107
Minguo calendar	1138 before ROC 民前1138年
Nanakshahi calendar	−694
Seleucid era	1085/1086 AG
Thai solar calendar	1316–1317
Tibetan calendar	ཆུ་མོ་གླང་ལོ་ (female Water-Ox); 900 or 519 or −253 — to — ཤིང་ཕོ་སྟག་ལོ་ (male Wood-Tiger); 901 or 520 or −252

The Frankish Kingdom under Charlemagne

Year 774 (DCCLXXIV) was a common year starting on Saturday of the Julian calendar. The denomination 774 for this year has been used since the early medieval period, when the Anno Domini calendar era became the prevalent method in Europe for naming years.

== Events ==
=== By place ===
==== Byzantine Empire ====
- Battle of Berzitia: The Bulgarian ruler (khagan) Telerig sends a small raiding army (12,000 men) to strike into the southwest of Macedonia, and capture Berzitia. Emperor Constantine V is informed about this raid by his spies in Pliska, and assembles an enormous force (80,000 men). He surprises the Bulgarians, who did not expect to find a Byzantine army there, and defeats them decisively. The Bulgars suffer heavy losses.
- Telerig sends a message to Constantine V, stating that he is going to flee in exile to Constantinople. In exchange, he asks the emperor to reveal the spies to his associates in Pliska for their own safety. Constantine sends the Bulgarian government a list of the spies; however, Telerig executes them all, and eliminates the Byzantine spy network within his government.

==== Europe ====
- King Charlemagne conquers the Lombard Kingdom, and establishes Frankish rule in Pavia, Venetia, Istria, Emilia, Tuscany, and Corsica. Charlemagne visits Rome; he confirms the Donation of Pepin (see 756) while insisting on his own sovereignty. Pope Adrian I grants him the title of patrician. Charlemagne puts down immediate insurrections in Friuli.
- June – King Desiderius surrenders the independence of the Lombards to the Franks, and is exiled to Corbie Abbey (Picardy). Charlemagne annexes northern Italy as a sub-kingdom, and takes the title of Rex Langobardorum. Some Lombards flee south to Benevento, which remains independent; Duke Arechis II retitles himself "Prince of Benevento".
- Saxon Wars: Saxon raiders ravage much of northern Hesse (modern Germany), and burn the abbey at Fritzlar, putting the abbot and monks to the sword. Charlemagne hurriedly returns to Austrasia, assembles local troops, and recaptures Eresburg, before the approach of winter halts further operations.
- King Aurelius dies after a 6-year reign, and is succeeded by his cousin-in-law Silo, as ruler of Asturias (Northern Spain).

==== Britain ====
- Unrest in the Northumbrian Church appears to lead to the expulsion of King Alhred, who is driven from his capital York. He sails from Bamburgh into exile amongst the Picts, where he is received by King Ciniod I. He is replaced by Æthelred I, the 11-year-old son of the late king Æthelwald Moll.
- King Offa of Mercia subdues the Anglo-Saxon kingdoms of Kent and Wessex (approximate date).

=== By topic ===
==== Astronomy ====
- A 1.2% growth of ^{14}C concentration recorded in tree rings, along with corresponding spikes of ^{36}Cl and ^{10}Be recorded in ice cores, suggests that a very strong solar storm may have hit Earth in either 774 or 775.

== Births ==
- Kūkai, Japanese Buddhist monk (d. 835)

== Deaths ==
- date unknown
  - Abd al-Rahman al-Awza'i, Muslim scholar (b. 707)
  - Abu Mikhnaf, Muslim historian (approximate date)
  - Amoghavajra, Chinese translator (b. 705)
  - Kim Daeseong, Korean minister (b. 700)
  - Aurelius, king of Asturias (Spain)
  - Lady K'awiil Yopaat, queen regnant of the Maya city of Toniná between 762 and 774.
- probable
  - Gummarus, Frankish nobleman and saint (b. 717)
  - Krishna I, ruler of the Rashtrakuta Empire
