= 628 =

Calendar year

628 in various calendars
- Gregorian calendar: 628; DCXXVIII
- Ab urbe condita: 1381
- Armenian calendar: 77; ԹՎ ՀԷ
- Assyrian calendar: 5378
- Balinese saka calendar: 549–550
- Bengali calendar: 34–35
- Berber calendar: 1578
- Buddhist calendar: 1172
- Burmese calendar: −10
- Byzantine calendar: 6136–6137
- Chinese calendar: 丁亥年 (Fire Pig); 3325 or 3118 — to — 戊子年 (Earth Rat); 3326 or 3119
- Coptic calendar: 344–345
- Discordian calendar: 1794
- Ethiopian calendar: 620–621
- Hebrew calendar: 4388–4389
- Hindu calendars
- Vikram Samvat: 684–685
- Shaka Samvat: 549–550
- Kali Yuga: 3728–3729
- Holocene calendar: 10628
- Iranian calendar: 6–7
- Islamic calendar: 6–7
- Japanese calendar: N/A
- Javanese calendar: 518–519
- Julian calendar: 628; DCXXVIII
- Korean calendar: 2961
- Minguo calendar: 1284 before ROC 民前1284年
- Nanakshahi calendar: −840
- Seleucid era: 939/940 AG
- Thai solar calendar: 1170–1171
- Tibetan calendar: མེ་མོ་ཕག་ལོ་ (female Fire-Boar); 754 or 373 or −399 — to — ས་ཕོ་བྱི་བ་ལོ་ (male Earth-Rat); 755 or 374 or −398

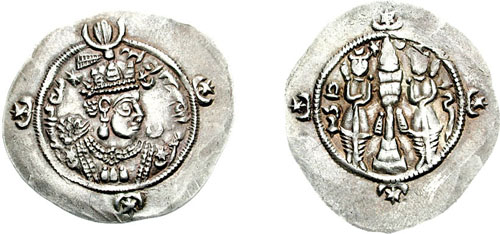
Coin of king Ardashir III (c. 621–630)

Year 628 (DCXXVIII) was a leap year starting on Friday of the Julian calendar. The denomination 628 for this year has been used since the early medieval period, when the Anno Domini calendar era became the prevalent method in Europe for naming years.

== Events ==
=== By place ===
==== Byzantine Empire ====
- Spring – Byzantine–Sassanid War: Emperor Heraclius issues an ultimatum for peace to king Khosrau II, but he refuses his generous terms. The war-weary Persians revolt against Khosrau's regime at Ctesiphon and install his son Kavadh II to the throne. He puts his father to death and begins negotiations with Heraclius. Kavadh is forced to return all the territories conquered during the war. The Persians must give up all of the trophies they have captured, including the relic of the True Cross. Evidently there is also a large financial indemnity. Having accepted a peace agreement on his own terms, Heraclius returns in triumph to Constantinople.
- Third Perso-Turkic War: The Western Göktürks under their leader Tong Yabghu Qaghan plunder Tbilisi (modern Georgia). The Persian defenders are executed or mutilated, Tong Yabghu appoints governors (tuduns) to manage various tribes under his overlordship.

==== Britain ====
- Battle of Cirencester: King Penda of Mercia defeats the West Saxons at Cirencester (South West England) in what later will be Gloucestershire. After reaching an agreement, he takes control of the Severn Valley and the minor kingdom of the Hwicce.

==== Persia ====
- February 25 – Khosrau II, the last great king of the Sasanian Empire, is overthrown by his son Kavadh II.
- September 6 – Ardashir III, age 7, succeeds his father Kavadh II as the twenty-fourth king of the Sasanian Empire on the latter's death from plague.

==== Arabia ====
- Muhammad, Islamic prophet, leads about 1,400 men on a pilgrimage to Mecca where their passage is blocked. The Quraysh tribe and the Muslim community in Medina sign a 10 year truce (Treaty of Hudaybiyyah).

=== By topic ===
==== Arts and sciences ====
- Brahmagupta writes the Brāmasphuțasiddhānta, an early, yet very advanced, math book.

==== Education ====
- The Shariah enjoins women as well as men to obtain secular and religious educations. It forbids eating pork, domesticated donkey, and other flesh denied to Jews by Mosaic law (approximate date).

==== Religion ====
- Muhammad's letters to world leaders explain the principles of the new monotheistic Muslim faith, as they will be contained in his book, the Quran.

== Births ==
- Adomnán, Irish abbot and hagiographer (d. 704)
- Benedict Biscop, Anglo-Saxon abbot (d. 690)
- Gao Zong, emperor of the Tang dynasty (d. 683)
- John Maron, Syriac monk and patriarch (d. 707)

== Deaths ==
- January 22 – Anastasius of Persia, monk
- Babai the Great, church father and theologian
- Du Yan, chancellor of the Tang dynasty
- February 28 – Khosrau II, king of the Persian Empire
- September 6 – Kavadh II, king of the Persian Empire
- June 3 – Liang Shidu, rebel leader
- Li Dashi, Chinese official and historian (b. 570)
- Shirin, wife of Khosrau II (approximate date)
- Suibne Menn, High King of Ireland
- April 15 – Suiko, empress of Japan
- Theodelinda, queen of the Lombards
- Tong Yabghu Qaghan, ruler of the Göktürks
