= Hidulf =

Hidulf (French: Hydulphe) may refer to:

- Hidulf of Lobbes (died 707), co-founder of Lobbes Abbey, saint
- Hildulf (died 707), also called Hidulf, founder of Moyenmoutier Abbey, saint
- Hidulf of Auch, archbishop (r. 975–978)
