= 765 =

Calendar year

765 in various calendars
| Gregorian calendar | 765; DCCLXV |
| Ab urbe condita | 1518 |
| Armenian calendar | 214; ԹՎ ՄԺԴ |
| Assyrian calendar | 5515 |
| Balinese saka calendar | 686–687 |
| Bengali calendar | 171–172 |
| Berber calendar | 1715 |
| Buddhist calendar | 1309 |
| Burmese calendar | 127 |
| Byzantine calendar | 6273–6274 |
| Chinese calendar | 甲辰年 (Wood Dragon); 3462 or 3255 — to — 乙巳年 (Wood Snake); 3463 or 3256 |
| Coptic calendar | 481–482 |
| Discordian calendar | 1931 |
| Ethiopian calendar | 757–758 |
| Hebrew calendar | 4525–4526 |
- Hindu calendars
| Vikram Samvat | 821–822 |
| Shaka Samvat | 686–687 |
| Kali Yuga | 3865–3866 |
| Holocene calendar | 10765 |
| Iranian calendar | 143–144 |
| Islamic calendar | 147–148 |
| Japanese calendar | Tenpyō-hōji 9 / Tenpyō-jingo 1 (天平神護元年) |
| Javanese calendar | 659–660 |
| Julian calendar | 765; DCCLXV |
| Korean calendar | 3098 |
| Minguo calendar | 1147 before ROC 民前1147年 |
| Nanakshahi calendar | −703 |
| Seleucid era | 1076/1077 AG |
| Thai solar calendar | 1307–1308 |
| Tibetan calendar | ཤིང་ཕོ་འབྲུག་ལོ་ (male Wood-Dragon); 891 or 510 or −262 — to — ཤིང་མོ་སྦྲུལ་ལོ་ (female Wood-Snake); 892 or 511 or −261 |

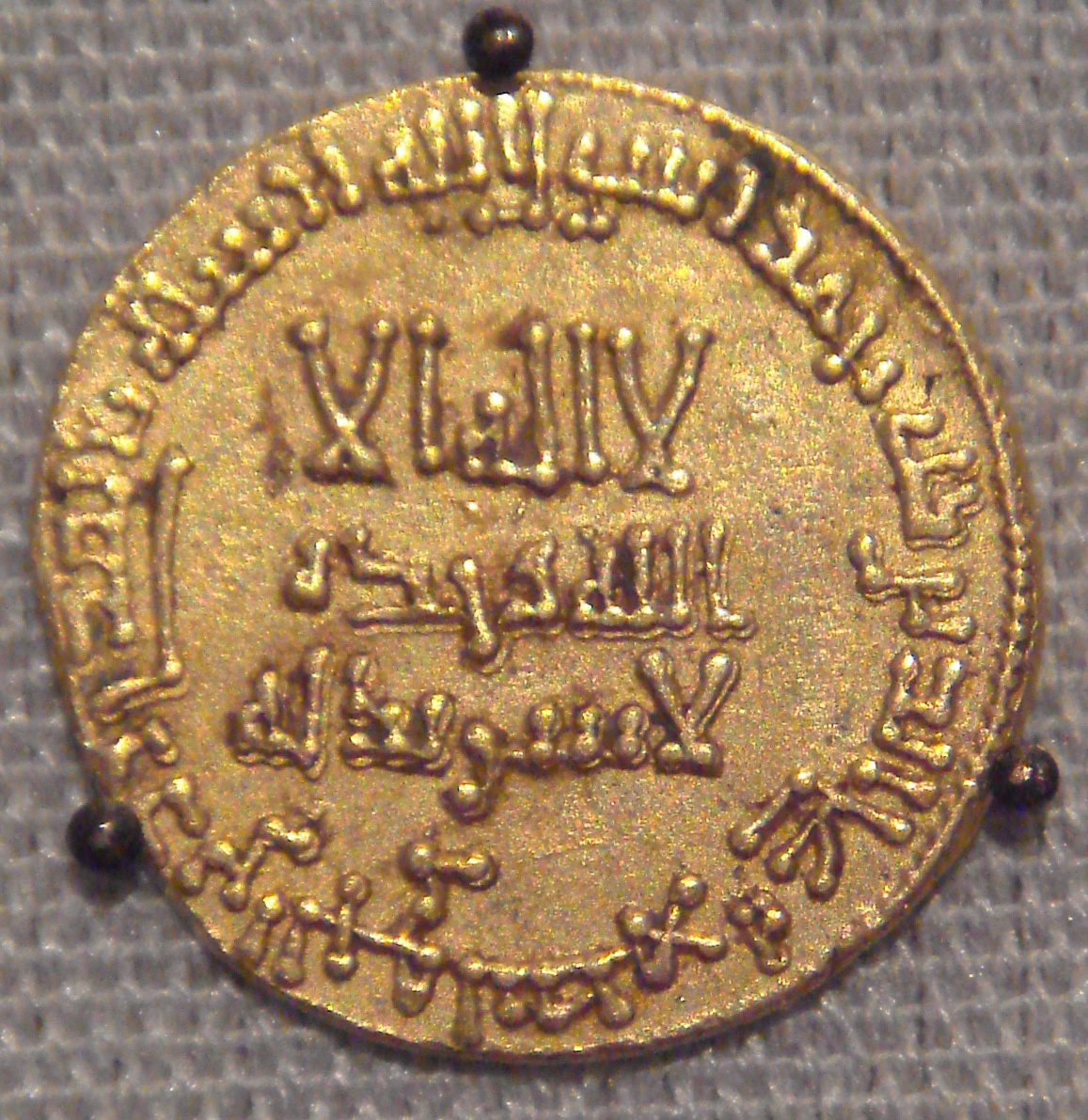
Gold dinar under Abbasid caliph al-Mansur in 765

Year 765 (DCCLXV) was a common year starting on Tuesday of the Julian calendar. The denomination 765 for this year has been used since the early medieval period, when the Anno Domini calendar era became the prevalent method in Europe for naming years.

== Events ==
=== By place ===
==== Europe ====
- King Pepin III ("the Short") restores the papal privileges (see Donation of Pepin) in Benevento and Tuscany territory (and partially in Spoleto).
- The Annals of Tigernach tell of a shortage of bread in Ireland.

==== Britain ====
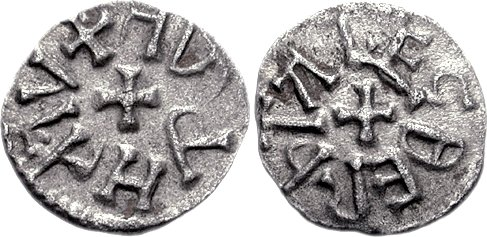
Sceat of King Alhred (r. 765–774)

- King Æthelwald of Northumbria is deposed at Pincanheale, possibly at a gathering of his own magnates. He is succeeded by Alhred, a distant cousin of the late king Oswulf.

==== Abbasid Caliphate ====
- The Zenata Berber tribe of Banu Ifran rebels against the Abbasid Caliphate, and creates an independent state centered around Tlemcen (modern Algeria). Their tribal chief Abu Qurra rebuilds the city (formerly, the Roman colonia Pomaria).

=== By topic ===
==== Agriculture ====
- European writings make the first known mention of a three-field system in use in medieval Europe. The crop rotation is the practice of growing a series of different types of crops in the same area in sequential seasons. Under this system, the land of an estate or village is divided into three large fields, and makes a given section of land productive 2 years out of 3, instead of every other year (approximate date).

== Births ==
- Ali al-Ridha, Shī‘ah Imām and Muslim scholar (d. 818)
- Fastrada, Frankish queen consort (d. 794)
- Han Hong, general of the Tang dynasty (d. 823)
- Pei Du, chancellor of the Tang dynasty (d. 839)

== Deaths ==
- September 27 – Pugu Huai'en, Chinese general during the Tang dynasty
- Ceolwulf, king of Northumbria
- Domnall Midi, High King of Ireland
- Ealdwulf, bishop of Lindsey
- Eardwulf, king of Kent
- Flaithbertach mac Loingsig, High King of Ireland
- Fujiwara no Toyonari, Japanese politician (b. 704)
- Gao Shi, Chinese poet
- Gyeongdeok, king of Silla (Korea)
- Hemele, bishop of Lichfield
- Ja'far al-Sadiq, sixth Shī‘ah Imām and Muslim scholar (b. 702)
- Junnin, emperor of Japan (b. 733)
- Miao Jinqing, chancellor of the Tang dynasty (b. 685)
- Stephen the Younger, Byzantine theologian (or 764)
- Telets, ruler (khagan) of the Bulgarian Empire
- Tello, bishop of Chur (approximate date)
- Wang Changling, Chinese poet and official (b. 698)
