= 670 =

Calendar year

670 in various calendars
- Gregorian calendar: 670; DCLXX
- Ab urbe condita: 1423
- Armenian calendar: 119; ԹՎ ՃԺԹ
- Assyrian calendar: 5420
- Balinese saka calendar: 591–592
- Bengali calendar: 76–77
- Berber calendar: 1620
- Buddhist calendar: 1214
- Burmese calendar: 32
- Byzantine calendar: 6178–6179
- Chinese calendar: 己巳年 (Earth Snake); 3367 or 3160 — to — 庚午年 (Metal Horse); 3368 or 3161
- Coptic calendar: 386–387
- Discordian calendar: 1836
- Ethiopian calendar: 662–663
- Hebrew calendar: 4430–4431
- Hindu calendars
- Vikram Samvat: 726–727
- Shaka Samvat: 591–592
- Kali Yuga: 3770–3771
- Holocene calendar: 10670
- Iranian calendar: 48–49
- Islamic calendar: 49–50
- Japanese calendar: Hakuchi 21 (白雉２１年)
- Javanese calendar: 561–562
- Julian calendar: 670; DCLXX
- Korean calendar: 3003
- Minguo calendar: 1242 before ROC 民前1242年
- Nanakshahi calendar: −798
- Seleucid era: 981/982 AG
- Thai solar calendar: 1212–1213
- Tibetan calendar: ས་མོ་སྦྲུལ་ལོ་ (female Earth-Snake); 796 or 415 or −357 — to — ལྕགས་ཕོ་རྟ་ལོ་ (male Iron-Horse); 797 or 416 or −356

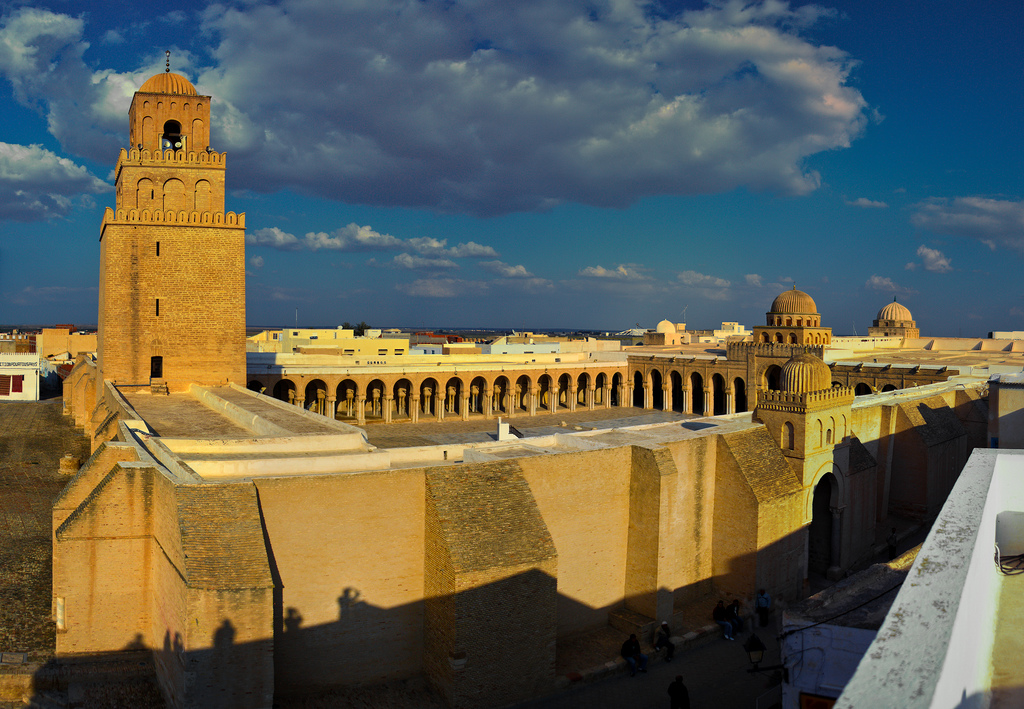
The Great Mosque of Kairouan (Tunisia)

Year 670 (DCLXX) was a common year starting on Tuesday of the Julian calendar, the 670th year of the Common Era (CE) and Anno Domini (AD) designations, the 670th year of the 1st millennium, the 70th year of the 7th century, and the 1st year of the 670s decade. The denomination 670 for this year has been used since the early medieval period, when the Anno Domini calendar era became the prevalent method in Europe for naming years.

== Events ==
=== By place ===
==== Byzantine Empire ====
- Arab-Byzantine War: The Arab fleet dominates the Aegean Sea and conquers the strategic islands, Rhodes, Cos and Chios. The shore on the southern part of Sea of Marmara is taken, providing an excellent base at Cyzicus to begin the blockade of Constantinople by sea.

==== Britain ====
- February 15 – King Oswiu of Northumbria dies during a pilgrimage to Rome in the company of bishop Wilfrid. He is succeeded by his son Ecgfrith, while his youngest son Ælfwine becomes king of Deira. Oswiu is buried at Whitby Abbey, alongside Edwin of Northumbria.

==== Arabian Empire ====
- Muslim Conquest: A 10,000-man Arab army under the command of general Uqba ibn Nafi invades the Byzantine Exarchate of Africa. He establishes a military base at Kairouan (Tunisia) for further invasions, and founds the Great Mosque, also known as the "Mosque of Uqba".

April 2 - Hasan Ibn Ali, dies at 44.

==== Asia ====
- Battle of Dafei River: Chinese forces (80,000 men), under general Xue Rengui of the Tang dynasty, are annihilated by the Tibetans, who take over control of the Tarim Basin.
- A Goguryeo restoration movement, led by Geom Mojam in northern Korea, places Anseung on the throne. Geom is later murdered, and Anseung flees to neighboring Silla.
- Tarumanagara (modern Indonesia) is divided into two kingdoms (Sunda Kingdom and Galuh Kingdom), with the Citarum River as the boundary (approximate date).
- A family register, Kogo-nenjaku, is prepared in Japan (approximate date) ^{[Significance of this event is unclear]}.

=== By topic ===
==== Religion ====
- Hōryū-ji, a Japanese Buddhist temple, burns to the ground after being hit by lightning; its reconstruction is immediately begun.
- The diocese of Dorchester-on-Thames in England is replaced by the Diocese of Winchester (approximate date).

== Births ==
- Bertrada of Prüm, Merovingian princess (approximate date)
- Childebert III, king of the Franks (approximate date)
- Corbinian, Frankish bishop (approximate date)
- Drogo, Carolingian duke of Champagne (d. 708)
- Petronax, Italian monk and abbot (approximate date)
- Smbat VI, Armenian prince (approximate date)
- Tariq ibn Ziyad, Muslim general (d. 720)
- Tatwine, archbishop of Canterbury (approximate date)
- Tridu Songtsen, emperor of Tibet (d. 704)
- Wihtred, king of Kent (approximate date)

== Deaths ==
- February 15 – Oswiu, king of Northumbria
- August 18 – Fiacre, Irish hermit
- Audomar, bishop of Thérouanne (approximate date)
- Geom Mojam, military leader of Goguryeo
- Godeberta, Frankish abbess (approximate date; b. ca. 640)
- Hasan ibn Ali, grandson of Muhammad and second Shi'a Imam (b. 625)
- Javanshir, king of Caucasian Albania
- Li Chunfeng, Chinese mathematician and historian (b. 602)
- Merewalh, king of Magonsæte (approximate date)
- Safiyya bint Huyayy, wife of Muhammad (approximate date)
- Theodard, bishop of Maastricht (approximate date)
