= Hayakawa =

Hayakawa (written: 早川) is a Japanese surname. Notable people with the surname include:

- Chuko Hayakawa (born 1945), Japanese politician
- Hiromi Hayakawa (1982–2017), Mexican singer
- Kazue Hayakawa (早川 一枝; born 1947), Japanese swimmer
- Kenichi Hayakawa (born 1986), Japanese male badminton player
- Kiyotaka Hayakawa (1946–2005), Japanese handball player
- Masato Hayakawa (born 1986), Japanese-American singer
- Miki Hayakawa (1899–1952), Japanese-American painter and printmaker
- Nami Hayakawa (born 1984), Japanese athlete
- Norio Hayakawa (born 1944), American activist
- Noritsugu Hayakawa (1881–1942), Japanese businessman
- Ren Hayakawa (born 1987), Japanese female archer
- S. I. Hayakawa (1906–1992), semanticist and United States Senator from California
- Sakura Hayakawa (born 1997), Japanese rhythmic gymnast
- Sayo Hayakawa (born 1983), Japanese fashion model
- Sessue Hayakawa (1889–1973), motion picture actor
- Tokuji Hayakawa (1894–1981), founder of Hayakawa Kinzoku Kougyou (the present-day Sharp Corporation)
- Tomonobu Hayakawa (born 1977), former Japanese footballer
- Hayakawa Senkichirō (1863–1922), Japanese politician and president of the South Manchurian Railway
- Lady Hayakawa (died 1613), one of Hōjō Ujiyasu's daughters, married to Imagawa Ujizane

== Fictional characters ==
- Aki Hayakawa (早川アキ), a character from the anime and manga series Chainsaw Man
- Tazuna Hayakawa (駿川たづな), a character from the video game Umamusume: Pretty Derby

== See also ==
- Hayakawa (restaurant), a Michelin-starred restaurant in Atlanta, Georgia
- Hayakawa Award, an award chosen annually by the readers of Hayakawa's SF Magazine
- Hayakawa Publishing, a Japanese publisher
- Hayakawa Station, a railway station on the Tōkaidō Main Line of East Japan Railway Company in Odawara, Kanagawa Prefecture, Japan
- Hayakawa, Yamanashi, a town in Japan
- Hayakawa or Haya River, a river in Kanagawa, Japan
