= Pope Constantine =

Head of the Catholic Church from 708 to 715

- Bishop of Rome
- Church: Catholic Church
- Papacy began: 25 March 708
- Papacy ended: 9 April 715
- Predecessor: Sisinnius
- Successor: Gregory II

Personal details
- Born: 664 Tyre, Jund al-Urdunn, Bilad al-Sham, Umayyad Caliphate
- Died: 9 April 715 (aged 50–51) Rome

Pope Constantine (Latin: Constantinus; 664 – 9 April 715) was the bishop of Rome from 25 March 708 to his death on 9 April 715. One of the last popes of the Byzantine Papacy, the defining moment of his pontificate was his 710/711 visit to Constantinople, where he compromised with Justinian II on the Trullan canons of the Quinisext Council. The city's next papal visit occurred in 1967.

== Upbringing ==
Constantine was born in 664 in Tyre in the Umayyad Caliphate (now in Lebanon), and he was of Greek descent. Fluent in the Greek language, he immersed in Eastern rituals and practices. By his upbringing, he would have been "fully at ease in the oriental milieu of the early-eighth-century Byzantine court". Except for Antipope Constantine, he was the only pope to bear such a "quintessentially" Eastern name of an emperor.

Before his selection as pope, he had visited Constantinople twice. He was one of the papal legates to the Third Council of Constantinople in 680/681. He also delivered a combative letter from Pope Leo II to Emperor Constantine IV in 682. He met and developed a rapport with Constantine IV's son Justinian II on both occasions.

== Pontificate ==
Constantine's predecessor, Sisinnius, was pope for only twenty days. Constantine became pope in March 708, less than two months later. He was one of the many Greek popes of the Byzantine Papacy, the period during which Rome was under the rule of the Byzantine Empire and popes required the approval of the emperor for consecration as pope. The defining issue of the papacy at the time of Constantine's election was the Western rejection of the Trullan canons of the Quinisext Council. Pope John VII had been sent the canons for approval and instead had sent them back, "without any emendations at all". John VII's predecessor, Sergius I, had declared that he would rather die than subscribe to the council.

=== Visit to Constantinople ===
In 710, Emperor Justinian II demanded in a iussio that Pope Constantine appear before him in Constantinople. The imperial mandate made it "obvious that the relentless emperor meant to settle once and for all the issue of Rome's acceptance of the Trullan decrees". Unlike his predecessors, Constantine neither delayed nor made excuses to avoid appearing in the imperial city; in fact, he "identified with Byzantium as perhaps no Roman pontiff before him ever had". Prior to Constantine's departure, Justinian had blinded Archbishop Felix of Ravenna for plotting to overthrow him, an act that had improved the papal-Byzantine rapport. His primary motivation for the trip was to forestall a rift between Rome and Constantinople over the Trullan decrees.

Constantine departed on 5 October 710. In Constantinople, Constantine stayed in the Placidia Palace, which had formerly been occupied by Pope Vigilius in 547, the representatives of Popes Martin I and Agatho (while attending the Third Council of Constantinople). Eleven of Constantine's thirteen companions who can be identified by name (two bishops, three priests, and all the ranking members of the papal chancellery and household) were also of Eastern extraction. Also accompanying Constantine was the future Pope Gregory II, then a deacon, and another Latin subdeacon Julian. Constantine specifically chose attendants who were "cut from similar cloth" as he, and likely to be sympathetic to the East.

While stopping in transit in Naples, Constantine crossed paths with the exarch of Ravenna, John III Rizocopo, then on his way to Rome to execute four high-ranking papal officials by cutting their throats. The four (as evidenced by their staying behind) were opposed to Constantine's new policy of rapprochement with Constantinople. Doubtlessly, Constantine himself learned of the exarch's errand before departing for Sicily, then Gallipoli, and then Otranto, where the group stayed for winter. In the spring, Constantine crossed the Ionian Sea, meeting the strategos of the imperial fleet on the island of Chios and was received by the Karabisianoi before proceeding to Constantinople.

Constantine entered Constantinople on a "horse caparisoned with gilded saddle clothes and golden bridles and bearing on his head the kamelaukion, or diadem, which the sovereign alone was authorized to wear and then only on 'a great public festival of the Lord'". Justinian II's son and co-emperor Tiberius, along with Patriarch Kyros, senators, nobles, clerics, and many others, greeted Constantine at the seventh milestone from the city in the style of an imperial adventus. Justinian II was in Nicaea at the time and urged the pontiff to meet him in Nicomedia. The Liber pontificalis recounts a bizarre scene of the crowned emperor prostrating himself before the pope, but a more mutual greeting is probable. That Sunday, Justinian II received communion from the hands of the pope and issued a vague confirmation of the various privileges of the Roman See.

The negotiations regarding the Trullan canons were conducted by the future Pope Gregory II. A degree of compromise (the "so-called Compromise of Nicomedia")—which "diplomatically skirted" the actual issue of their acceptance—was reached. While Constantine made concessions regarding the economia, he did not give ground on the vast majority of the Roman grievances. The agreement was more designed to secure East–West political unity than resolve any doctrinal dispute. The fact of Constantine's having been summoned to Constantinople was the real proof that the "imperial writ still ran in Rome". Constantine left Constantinople in October 711. He was the last pope to visit the city until Paul VI did in 1967.

=== Rejection of monothelitism ===
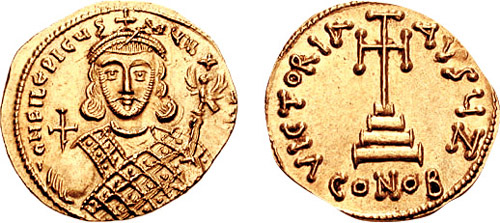
Constantine refused to accept coins minted with the image of Philippicus.

Justinian II was killed by his mutinous troops in November 711, shortly after Constantine's return to Rome. The new emperor, Philippicus, was an adherent of monothelitism, and rejected the arrangements of the Third Council of Constantinople. He demanded Constantine's support of the view that Christ had only one will. In 712, Constantine rejected Philippicus' demand to revive monothelitism. He further refused to receive an imperial portrait or coins with the emperor's image and also refused to commemorate the emperor in Mass.

As the exarch attempted to enforce the imperial presence, clashes occurred, which Constantine calmed. Philippicus was overthrown in June 713 and his successor, Anastasius II, sent Exarch Scholasticus and a letter to the pope affirming imperial support for the Sixth General Council.

=== Death ===
Upon his death in Rome on 9 April 715, Constantine was succeeded by Pope Gregory II.

== Notes ==
Catholic Church titles
Preceded by Sisinnius	Pope; 708–715	Succeeded by Gregory II
