= Hayakawa Senkichirō =

Japanese politician

- 早川 千吉郎
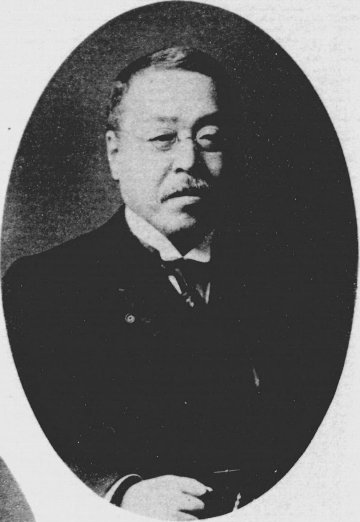
- Hayakawa Senkichirō

Member of the House of Peers
- In office 2 June 1920 – 14 October 1922 Nominated by the Emperor

Personal details
- Born: 5 August 1863 Kanazawa, Ishikawa, Japan
- Died: 14 October 1922 (aged 59)
- Education: Tokyo Imperial University
- Occupation: Bureaucrat, politician and entrepreneur

Hayakawa Senkichirō (早川 千吉郎; 5 August 1863 – 14 October 1922) was a bureaucrat, politician and entrepreneur in late Meiji and early Taishō period Empire of Japan. He is noted for his involvement in the development of the South Manchurian Railway.

== Biography ==
Hayakawa was born in Kanazawa, Ishikawa Prefecture. He graduated from the Law School of Tokyo Imperial University in 1887. In January 1890, he was hired by the Ministry of Finance, and became a director of the Bank of Japan in 1899.

After leaving public service, Hayakawa became director of the Mitsui Bank in 1901, and chairman of the board in 1909. With the creation of the Mitsui Gomei zaibatsu through the merger of Mitsui Bank with Mitsui Trading, he became vice director in 1918. He left Mitsui the following year to become director of the Bank of Chōsen. From 1920-1922 he was an appointed member of the House of Peers. In May 1921, he also became President of the South Manchurian Railway Company, and died in office due to a stroke in October 1922.

Hayakawa was a close friend of Inazō Nitobe and Tsuda Umeko, and assisted their efforts in promoting the education of women in Japan through the establishment of a non-profit charity foundation. Hayakawa, a prominent lay Buddhist, and student of the Zen abbot of Engaku-ji, Suzuki Daisetsu, also founded the Kochokan, a boarding house for samurai-descended students from Ishikawa Prefecture in Tokyo.
