= Pope Sisinnius =

Head of the Catholic Church in 708

- Bishop of Rome
- Church: Catholic Church
- Papacy began: 15 January 708
- Papacy ended: 4 February 708
- Predecessor: John VII
- Successor: Constantine

Personal details
- Died: 4 February 708 Rome
- Buried: Old St. Peter's Basilica, Rome

Pope Sisinnius (died 4 February 708) was the bishop of Rome from 15 January 708 to his death on 4 February 708. Besides being Syrian and his father being named John, little is known of Sisinnius' early life or career. At the time of his election to the papal throne, Sisinnius suffered from severe gout, leaving him weak. During the course of his twenty-day papacy, Sisinnius consecrated a bishop for Corsica and ordered the reinforcement of the walls surrounding the papal capital of Rome. On his death, Sisinnius was buried in Old St. Peter's Basilica. He was succeeded by Pope Constantine.

== Background ==
=== Religious ===
In the late fifth century, the churches of the East and West were divided over the monophysite controversy, the East largely accepting that Jesus Christ's divine nature overshadowed his human nature, and the West (under the guidance of the 451 Council of Chalcedon) believing in a hypostatic union. The Eastern Byzantine emperors sought a theological compromise to hold their domains together, but the popes in Rome (the papal capital) suspected them of harboring heretical sympathies and accordingly attempted to resist imperial claims of dominance over the Church. By the time of Pope Martin I (r. 649–653/4), East–West relations had become incredibly strained; by the late seventh century, as the historian Eamon Duffy describes, "[t]he requirement that the pope[s] should wait for confirmation of their appointment from Constantinople before they could be considered was waived, the Exarch at Ravenna [the Byzantine representative in the Italian Peninsula] being empowered to issue the necessary mandate".

The role of the pope in the time of Sisinnius, and the first millennium as a whole, was limited to that of a mediator. As the theologian Richard McBrien explains, the popes were not able to appoint all bishops, nor were they able to "govern the universal Church". They also did not publish encyclicals or catechisms, and were not able to canonize saints or convene ecumenical councils.

=== Political ===
The centuries preceding the reign of Sisinnius were characterized by external intervention in the selection of the pope. The Byzantine Empire nominated men of the Roman aristocracy to the office; the Italian Ostrogothic kingdom chose members of the provincial aristocracy. As the historian Jeffrey Richards explains, "[t]he reasons for this are both political and social". The monarchs of both states relied on the support of the groups they installed on the papal throne. The seventh century saw a shift in the geographical origins of the popes: only eight out of twenty-seven popes between 604 and 752 were Roman, (Note: Most were from Greece, Syria, or Palestine.) compared to the figure of eleven out of seventeen from 483 to 604. The change has its origins in the restoration of Byzantine dominion over Italy under Justinian I (r. 527–565), which saw the phasing out of the Roman Senate as an institution as senatorial families were either executed or fled to the East. During the Ostrogothic kingdom's rule over Rome from the late-fifth to the mid-sixth century, the senate held major sway over the selection of new popes, but following the imperial reconquest, control over the papal throne was no longer in its hands. Instead, the election of the pope was left to the clergy of Rome, the city's people, and the Imperial military garrison. Richards argues that before the fall of the Western Roman Empire in 476 and after the rise of the Holy Roman Empire in Italy in 752, the "prestige, power and influence" of the pope was augmented under the protection of the imperial powers, and notes the papacy's growth in power during the sixth and seventh centuries.

Sisinnius' predecessor, John VII (r. 705–707) was installed as the bishop of Rome the same year that the Byzantine emperor Justinian II (r. 685–695, 705–711) was restored to his throne. Shortly after regaining power, the latter sent several decrees of canon law from the 692 Quinisext Council to John, any of which he could approve or reject. Out of worry of displeasing the Emperor, the Pope sent the decrees back to Justinian unchanged. The issue of the Quinisext canons continued into the reign of Sisinnius' successor, Constantine, who travelled to Constantinople in 711 to negotiate with the East over the matter.

== Life and papacy ==
The Duchy of Rome (numbered 3) within the Byzantine Empire in Sisinnius' time

Little information about Sisinnius before his election to the papal throne is extant. Much of what is known about him is deduced from four lines of the Liber Pontificalis (English: Book of the Popes), a collection of papal biographies. The historian Jean Durliat stated that "[t]he concision of his biography may be interpreted as the result of aversion to him on the part of the Roman clergy, or perhaps a reflection of the absence of anomaly in an ecclesiastical career that led naturally to the pontificate". By birth, Sisinnius was Syrian and his father was named John. Sisinnius was respected for his upright, moral disposition and concern for the people of Rome, politically and militarily part of the Exarchate of Ravenna. Like many of his immediate predecessors, he was likely not a member of the upper class, as indicated by the paucity of donations of gold and silver during his pontificate and the pontificates of the popes between him and Pope Honorius I in the seventh century.

Sisinnius was elected to become the bishop of Rome, likely in October 707, and was consecrated on 15 January 708; the nearly three-month delay was due to a wait for confirmation of Sisinnius' election by Theophylact, the Exarch of Ravenna. By the time of his election, Sisinnius was ridden with gout and could not feed himself using his hands. He was one of many such early medieval popes who were elderly, which Richards explains by saying that "[o]ld age in the popes generally also betokened experience" in either administrative or spiritual tasks, which the electorate would have taken into consideration when choosing a new pope. During his reign, Sisinnius consecrated a bishop for Corsica. He also ordered the preparation of lime so that the walls surrounding the city of Rome, which by then were in poor condition due to past attacks, could be reinforced. The task was never executed, as Sisinnius died in Rome on 4 February after a reign of twenty days. He was buried in the left nave of Old St. Peter's Basilica; his tomb was destroyed in the 17th century during the Basilica's demolition. The next pope elected was Constantine, another Syrian, who was consecrated on 25 March 708.

== Sources ==
- Duffy, Eamon (1997). Saints & Sinners: A History of the Popes. New Haven: Yale University Press. ISBN 978-0-30-007332-4.
- Durliat, Jean (2002a). "Sisinnius". In Levillain, Phillipe (ed.). The Papacy: An Encyclopedia. Vol. 3.
- Durliat, Jean (2002b). "Constantine I". In Levillain, Phillipe (ed.). The Papacy: An Encyclopedia. Vol. 1.
- Kelly, J. N. D.; Walsh, M. J. (1988) [1986]. Oxford Dictionary of Popes. Oxford: Oxford University Press. ISBN 978-0-19-282085-3. OCLC 59172482.
- Levillain, Philippe, ed. (2002c). The Papacy: An Encyclopedia. Vol. 1. New York City: Routledge. ISBN 0-415-92228-3. OCLC 47237751.
- McBrien, Richard P. (2000). Lives of the Popes. New York City: HarperCollins. ISBN 978-0-06-065304-0. OCLC 43458291.
- McBrien, Richard P. (2006). The Pocket Guide to the Popes. San Francisco: HarperCollins. ISBN 0061137731.
- Reardon, Wendy J. (2004). The Deaths of the Popes. Jefferson, North Carolina: McFarland & Co. ISBN 0-7864-1527-4. OCLC 55845524.
- Richards, Jeffrey (1979). The Popes and the Papacy in the Early Middle Ages, 476-752. London: Routledge & Kegan Paul. ISBN 0-7100-0098-7. OCLC 4952990.

Catholic Church titles
Vacant Title last held by John VII	Pope; 708	Vacant Title next held by Constantine
