= Abbo II of Metz =

Bishop
- Died: 707
- Feast: 15 April

Abbo II of Metz was the thirty-fifth bishop of the Diocese of Metz, following Landry of Metz. He is commemorated with a feast day of 15 April.

Abbo served as bishop from 697–707.

== Sources ==
- Holweck, F. G., A Biographical Dictionary of the Saints. St. Louis, MO: B. Herder Book Co., 1924.
