= Kim Daeseong =

Chief Minister of Silla (700–774)

- Hangul: 김대성
- Hanja: 金大城
- RR: Gim Daeseong
- MR: Kim Taesŏng

Kim Daeseong (Korean: 김대성; Hanja: 金大城; 700–774) was a chief minister of Silla during the reign of King Seongdeok in the Unified Silla period. He was the son of a previous chief minister, Kim Mullyang (김문량, 金文亮). He is credited with the establishment of the famed Bulguksa temple and Seokguram shrine in Gyeongju.

The Samguk Yusa relates a tale that Kim Daeseong was the reincarnation of the child of a pious but poor woman who offered up a field which she had worked long and hard to buy. He is said to have built Bulguksa in memory of his parents of the current life, and Seokguram in memory of his parents in the former life.

== See also ==
- History of Korea
