= Muhammad ibn Marwan =

Umayyad prince and general (died 719/720)

Muhammad ibn Marwan محمد بن مروان

Governor of Mesopotamia, Armenia and Adharbayjan
- In office 690s–709/10
- Monarchs: Abd al-Malik (r. 685–705); Al-Walid I (r. 705–715)
- Succeeded by: Maslama ibn Abd al-Malik

Personal details
- Died: 719 or 720
- Spouses: Umm Jumayl bint Abd al-Rahman ibn Zayd ibn al-Khattab; Bint Yazid ibn Abd Allah ibn Shayba ibn Rabi'a; Umm Marwan (concubine)
- Children: Marwan; Yazid
- Parent(s): Marwan I (father); Zaynab (mother)

Military service
- Allegiance: Umayyad Caliphate
- Branch/service: Umayyad army
- Years of service: 690–710
- Battles/wars: Second Fitna; Battle of Maskin; Battle of Sebastopolis; Revolt of Ibn al-Ash'ath

Abū ʿAbd al-Raḥmān Muḥammad ibn Marwān ibn al-Ḥakam (Arabic: أبو عبد الرحمن محمد بن مروان بن الحكم) (died 719/720) was an Umayyad prince and one of the most important generals of the Umayyad Caliphate in the period 690–710, and the one who completed the Arab conquest of Armenia. He defeated the Byzantines and conquered their Armenian territories, crushed an Armenian rebellion in 704–705 and made the country into an Umayyad province. His son Marwan II (r. 744–750) was the last Umayyad caliph.

== Life ==
=== Early life and governorship of Jazira ===
Muhammad was the son of Caliph Marwan I (r. 684–685) by a slave girl named Zaynab, and hence half-brother to Caliph Abd al-Malik ibn Marwan (r. 685–705).

During the Second Fitna, Muhammad commanded his brother's advance guard at the Battle of Maskin against Mus'ab ibn al-Zubayr (brother of the Mecca-based rival caliph Abdallah ibn al-Zubayr) in 691. With the help of aristocratic Persian Christian physician Mardanshāh, he was able to retake Nisibis and entrusted Mardanshāh as governor. In 692, following the victory over al-Zubayr, he was appointed governor of Bēt Nahrīn (North Mesopotamia) and the Tur Abdin while holding authority in Harran. According to the Life of Simeon of the Olives, who became bishop of Harran during Muhammad's governorship, he established a madrasa there.

In 692, he defeated a Byzantine army in the Battle of Sebastopolis, by persuading the large Slavic contingent of the imperial army to defect to him. In the next year, he invaded Byzantine Asia Minor with the assistance of the same Slavs, and scored a success against a Byzantine army near Germanikeia, while in 695, he raided the province of Fourth Armenia.

=== Conquest of Armenia ===
In 699–701, along with his nephew, Abdallah ibn Abd al-Malik, he was dispatched to Iraq to assist the governor al-Hajjaj ibn Yusuf in the suppression of the rebellion of Abd al-Rahman ibn Muhammad ibn al-Ash'ath. In 701 Muhammad campaigned against the Byzantine-controlled Armenian territory east of the Euphrates, and forced its population and the local governor, Baanes, to submit to the Caliphate. Soon after his departure, however, the Armenians rebelled and called for Byzantine aid. Repeated campaigns in 703 and 704 by Muhammad and Abdallah ibn Abd al-Malik crushed the revolt, and Muhammad further secured Muslim control by organizing a large-scale massacre of the Armenian princely nakharar families in 705.

When al-Walid I acceded to the throne in 705, Muhammad began to be eclipsed by his nephew Maslama ibn Abd al-Malik, who like him was also born to a slave-girl. Maslama assumed the leadership of the campaigns against Byzantium, and finally replaced Muhammad completely in his capacity as governor of Mesopotamia, Armenia and Azerbaijan in 709/10. Muhammad died in 719/20.

== Wives and children ==
Muhammad was the father of the last Umayyad caliph, Marwan II (r. 744–750) through an unnamed woman, most likely of non-Arab origin (a Kurd according to some accounts). Some sources report that Muhammad had taken her captive during the suppression of Ibn al-Zubayr's revolt. Muhammad's grandson, Aban ibn Yazid, served as governor of Harran under Marwan II; following the defeat at the Battle of the Zab and Marwan's retreat to the city, Aban submitted to the pursuing Abbasid commander Abd Allah ibn Ali and arranged a capitulation agreement (sulh) as the Abbasid revolution brought down Umayyad rule.

Muhammad was also wed to two Qurayshite women, Umm Jumayl bint Abd al-Rahman, the granddaughter of Zayd ibn al-Khattab of the Banu Adi clan, and Bint Yazid ibn Abd Allah, the granddaughter of Shayba ibn Rabi'a of the Banu Abd Shams, the parent clan of the Umayyads.

== Sources ==
- Donner, Fred (2014). "Was Marwan ibn al-Hakam the First "Real" Muslim". In Savant, Sarah Bowen; de Felipe, Helena (eds.). Genealogy and Knowledge in Muslim Societies: Understanding the Past. Edinburgh: Edinburgh University Press. ISBN 978-0-7486-4497-1.
- Hawting, G. R. (1991). "Marwān II". In Bosworth, C. E.; van Donzel, E. & Pellat, Ch. (eds.). The Encyclopaedia of Islam, Second Edition. Volume VI: Mahk–Mid. Leiden: E. J. Brill. pp. 623–625. ISBN 978-90-04-08112-3.
- Hoyland, Robert G.; Brunner, Kyle B.; Tannous, Jack Boulos Victor (2021). The Life of Simeon of the Olives: An Entrepreneurial Saint of Early Islamic North Mesopotamia. Gorgias Press LLC. ISBN 978-1-4632-4346-3.
- Lilie, Ralph-Johannes; Ludwig, Claudia; Pratsch, Thomas; Zielke, Beate (2000). "Muḥammad ibn Marwān (# 5189)". Prosopographie der mittelbyzantinischen Zeit: 1. Abteilung (641–867), Band 3: Leon (# 4271) – Placentius (# 6265) (in German). Berlin and Boston: De Gruyter. pp. 322–323. ISBN 978-3-11-016673-6.
- Robinson, Majied (2020). Marriage in the Tribe of Muhammad: A Statistical Study of Early Arabic Genealogical Literature. Berlin: Walter de Gruyter. ISBN 9783110624168.
- Treadgold, Warren (1997). A History of the Byzantine State and Society. Stanford, California: Stanford University Press. ISBN 0-8047-2630-2.
- Zetterstéen, K. V. (1993). "Muḥammad b. Marwān". In Bosworth, C. E.; van Donzel, E.; Heinrichs, W. P. & Pellat, Ch. (eds.). The Encyclopaedia of Islam, Second Edition. Volume VII: Mif–Naz. Leiden: E. J. Brill. p. 408. doi:10.1163/1573-3912_islam_SIM_5363. ISBN 978-90-04-09419-2.
- Robinson, Chase F. (2010). "The Violence of the Abbasid Revolution". In Suleiman, Yasir (ed.). Living Islamic History: Studies in Honour of Professor Carole Hillenbrand. Edinburgh: Edinburgh University Press. pp. 226–251. ISBN 978-0-7486-3738-6.
