= Pope John VII =

Head of the Catholic Church from 705 to 707

- Bishop of Rome
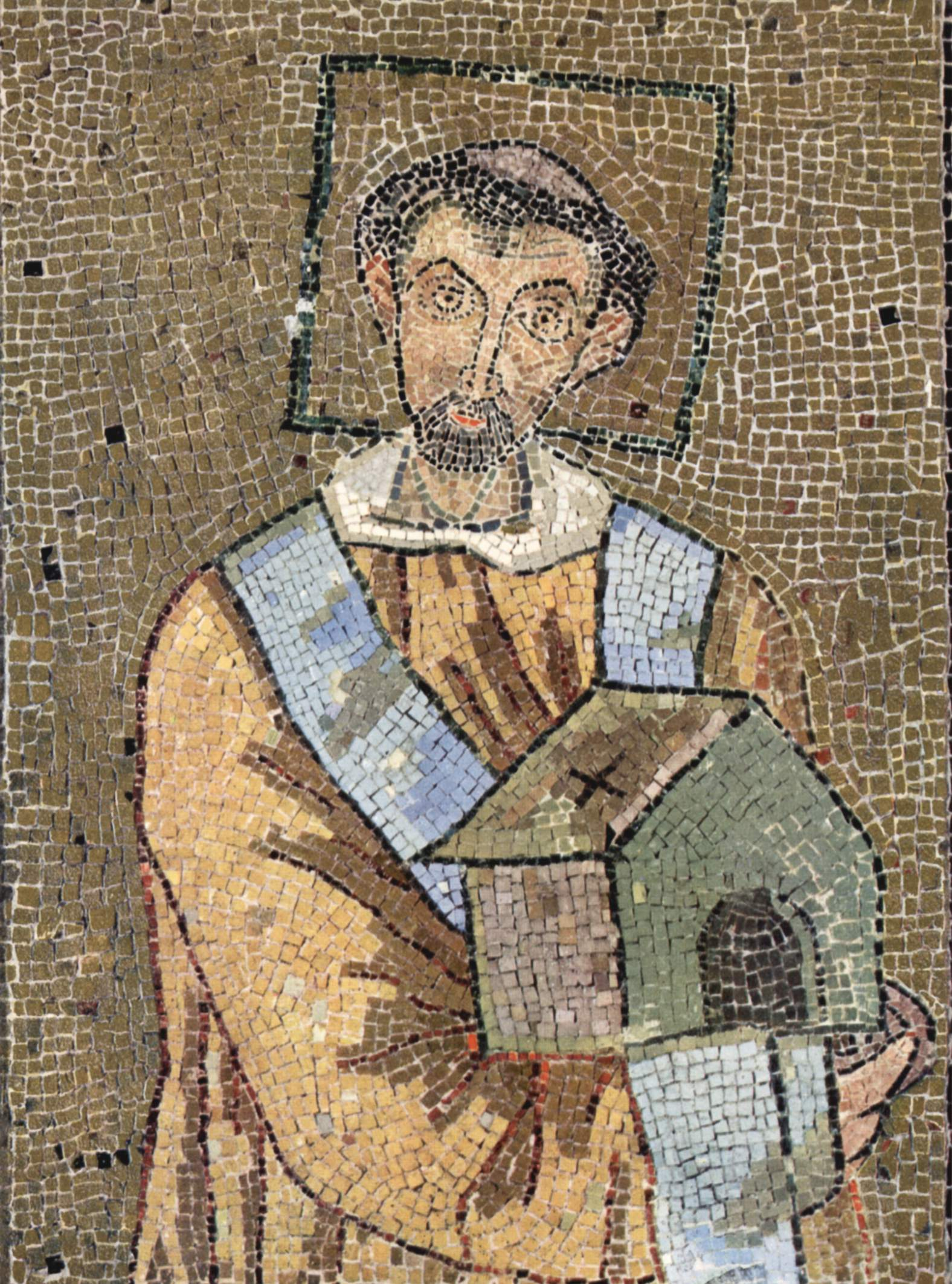
- Byzantine Mosaic of John VII, c. 705
- Church: Catholic Church
- Papacy began: 1 March 705
- Papacy ended: 18 October 707
- Predecessor: John VI
- Successor: Sisinnius

Personal details
- Born: 650 Rossano in Calabria, Byzantine Empire
- Died: 18 October 707 (aged 56–57)

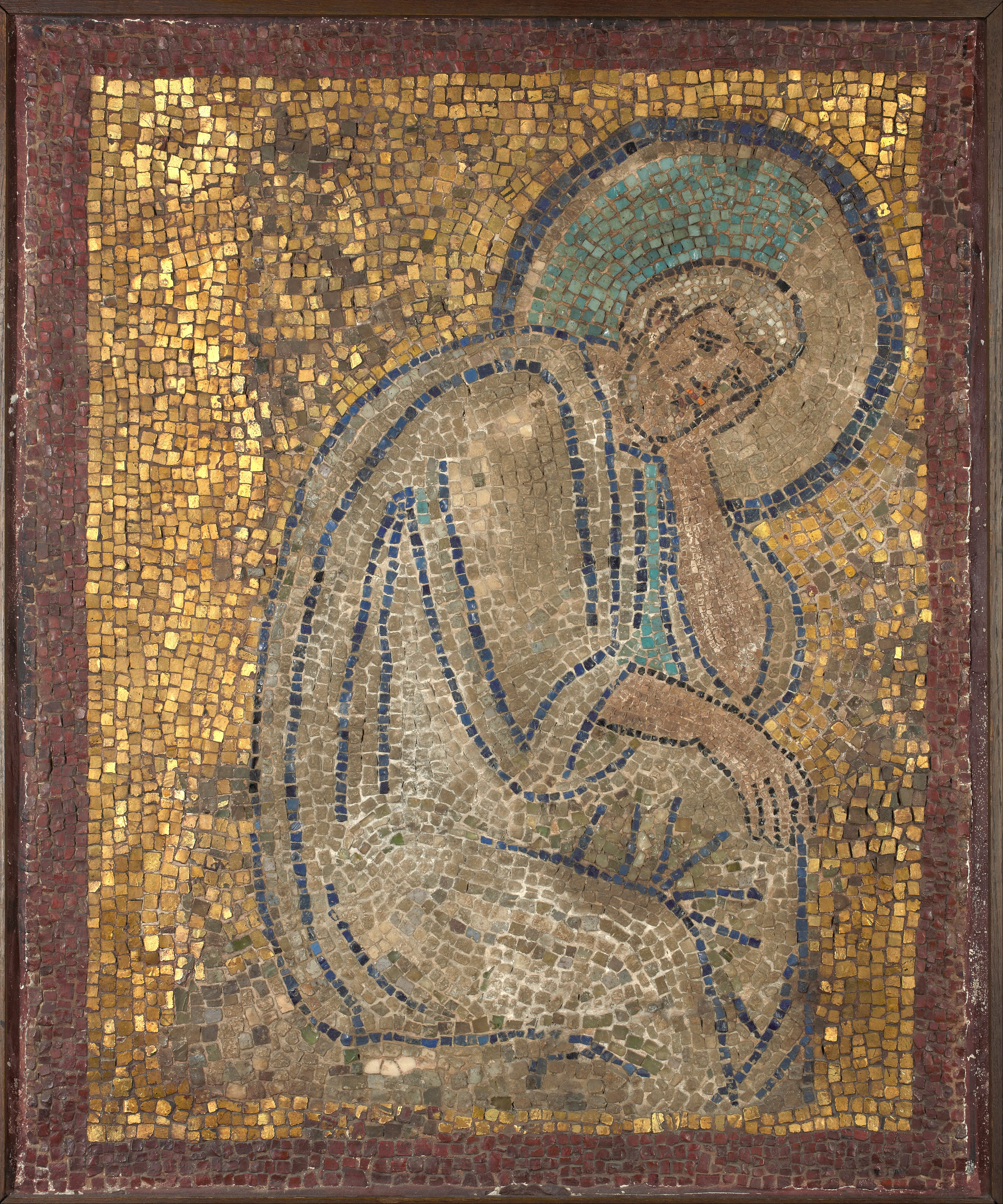
Saint Joseph, from the Oratory of John VII

Pope John VII (Latin: Ioannes VII; c. 650 – 18 October 707) was the bishop of Rome from 1 March 705 to his death on 18 October 707. He was an ethnic Greek, one of the Byzantine popes, but had better relations with the Lombards, who ruled much of Italy, than with Emperor Justinian II, who ruled the rest.

== Family ==
John was an ethnic Greek, a native of Rossano in Calabria. His father, Plato (c. 620 – 686), was the curator of the Palatine Hill for the Byzantine emperor. This makes John the first pope to be the son of a Byzantine official. His mother was called Blatta (c. 627 – 687).

== Pontificate ==
John VII was selected to succeed John VI, another Greek, on 1 March 705. He had good relations with the Lombards, who then ruled much of Italy. However, his relations with Emperor Justinian II were far from smooth. Papal relations with Byzantium had soured over the Quinisext Council of 692. Scholarly debate contests John VII's stance on the canons. He did not ratify them, and they were deeply unpopular in Italy. Nonetheless, he was criticized, most unusually, by the Liber pontificalis for not signing them:

He [Emperor Justinian II] despatched two metropolitan bishops, also sending with them a mandate in which he requested and urged the pontiff [John VII] to gather a council of the apostolic church, and to confirm such of them as he approved, and quash and reject those which were adverse. But he, terrified in his human weakness, sent them back to the prince by the same metropolitans without any emendations at all.

John VII died 18 October, 707 and was buried in the Chapel of the Blessed Virgin Mary which had been added on to St. Peter's. He was succeeded by Sisinnius.

== Legacy ==
Several monuments in Rome are connected with John. The most notable is the Santa Maria Antiqua church at the foot of the Palatine Hill. Traces of an episcopal palace Episcopium associated with John have been discovered upon the Palatine. John VII also constructed the Oratory of John VII in Old St Peter's Basilica, dedicated to the Theotokos. Fragments of the mosaic decoration can be found in the Vatican Grottoes.

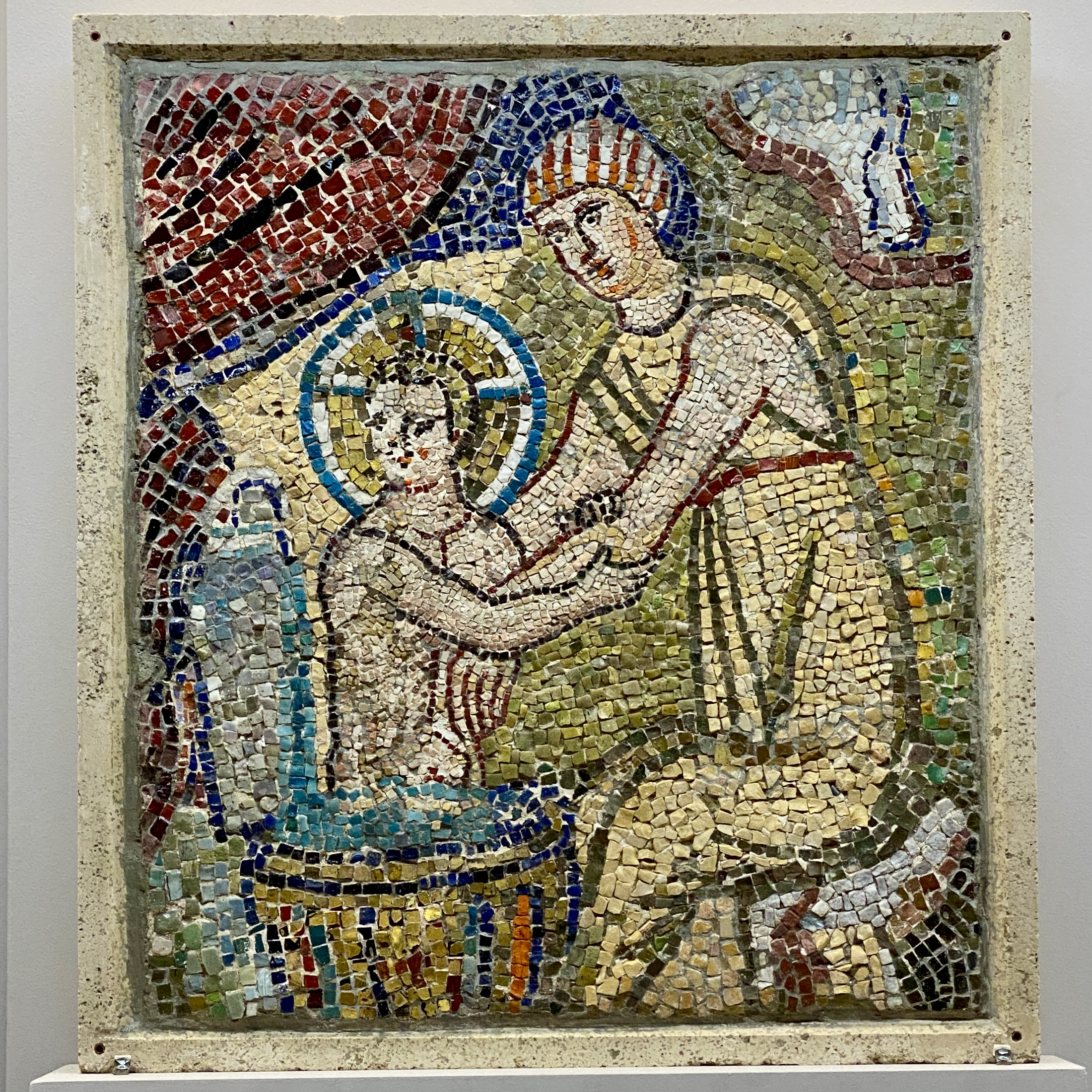
"The Washing of Baby Jesus," mosaic fragment from the Oratory of John VII. 705–707.

Furthermore, a sizeable icon, known as the Madonna della Clemenza and housed in Santa Maria in Trastevere, is believed to have been commissioned under the patronage of John. He also restored the monastery of Subiaco, destroyed by the Lombards in 601.

== Notes ==
Catholic Church titles
Preceded by John VI	Pope; 705–707	Succeeded by Sisinnius
