= 780s =

Decade

The 780s decade ran from January 1, 780, to December 31, 789.

== Events ==
=== 780 ===
==== By place ====
====== Byzantine Empire ======
- September 8 - Emperor Leo IV ("the Khazar") dies after a 5-year reign, in which he has been dominated by his wife Irene of Athens, an iconodule. He is succeeded by his 9-year-old son Constantine VI; due to his minority, Irene and her chief minister Staurakios exercise a regency over him.

====== Europe ======
- Saxon Wars: King Charlemagne decrees the death penalty for any subdued Saxon refusing Christian baptism. Meanwhile Widukind builds up rebel strength in northern Saxony.
- The city of Osnabrück, developed as a marketplace, is founded by Charlemagne (approximate date).

====== Britain ======
- The city of Aldwych rises as an important trading centre in London, under Mercian control. King Offa of Mercia possibly establishes a royal palace at Aldermanbury, on the site of the old Roman Cripplegate fort and amphitheatre (approximate date).

====== Asia ======
- King Hyegong of Silla is killed in a revolt, terminating the kingly line of succession of former ruler Muyeol. He is the architect of Silla's unification of the Korean Peninsula (see 668).

==== By topic ====
====== Religion ======
- Borobudur, a Buddhist temple complex in Magelang (modern Indonesia), is begun (approximate date).

=== 781 ===
==== By place ====
====== Europe ======
- King Charlemagne has his son Carloman (renamed Pepin) anointed "King of Italy", and he is crowned by Pope Adrian I with the Iron Crown of Lombardy. His younger brother Charles I is anointed king of Aquitaine, and Louis the Pious (only 3-years old) is appointed sub-king of Italy and Aquitaine, following the conversion of Aquitaine from a Duchy to a sub-kingdom.
- Charlemagne meets Alcuin, Anglo-Saxon missionary, in Italy, and invites him to Aachen, where he becomes Charlemagne's chief adviser on religious and educational matters (approximate date).
- The Frankish currency called the livre carolingienne is minted for the first time (approximate date).

====== Asia ======
- Yang Yan, Chinese statesman, commits suicide after being accused of bribery and corruption. He is credited with reforming the tax system for peasants, reducing the power of the aristocratic classes, and eliminating their tax-free estates.
- April 30 – Emperor Kōnin of Japan abdicates the throne after an 11-year reign, in favour of his half-Korean son, Kanmu.
- July 31 – The oldest recorded eruption of Mount Fuji occurs (Traditional Japanese date: July 6, 781).
- New city of Bian (汴) is constructed on the site of Kaifeng during the Tang dynasty (China).
- Marriage of Abbasid prince Harun ibn al-Mahdi (future caliph Harun al-Rashid) and Zubaidah bint Ja'far.

==== By topic ====
====== Religion ======
- Charlemagne defines the Papal territory (see Papal States). He codifies the regions over which the pope would be temporal sovereign: the Duchy of Rome is expanded by Ravenna, the Duchy of the Pentapolis, parts of the Duchy of Benevento, Tuscany, Corsica and Lombardy.
- Nestorians in China build Christian monasteries, and erect the Nestorian Stele (approximate date).

=== 782 ===
==== By place ====
====== Abbasid Empire ======
- Arab–Byzantine War: Arab forces (95,000 men) under Harun al-Rashid, son of the Abbasid caliph Al-Mahdi, cross the Taurus Mountains and capture the Byzantine border fortress of Magida. Harun leaves his lieutenant Al-Rabi' ibn Yunus to besiege the city of Nakoleia (Phrygia), while another force (30,000 men), probably under Yahya ibn Khalid, is sent to raid the western coastlands of Asia Minor. Harun himself, with the main army, advances to the Opsician Theme.
- Summer – Harun al-Rashid reaches as far as Chrysopolis, across the Bosporus Straits from the Byzantine capital, Constantinople. After the defection of the Armenian general Tatzates, Empress Irene accepts a three-year truce, including the annual payment of a tribute of 70,000 or 90,000 gold dinars, and the handing over of 10,000 silk garments. Harun releases all his captives (5,600 men), including chief minister Staurakios and other hostages.

====== Byzantine Empire ======
- Emperor Constantine VI is betrothed to the 6-year-old Rotrude, daughter of Charlemagne; Irene sends a scholar monk called Elisaeus to educate her in Greek language and manners.

====== Europe ======
- Summer – Saxon Wars: King Charlemagne sends a punitive expedition (an elite force of Eastern Frankish troops) under the command of Adalgis the Chamberlain, Gallo, and Worad, supported by Saxon forces, to deal with the Saxons and Sorb raiders in Thuringia.
- Battle of Süntel: The Franks under Charlemagne are defeated by Saxon rebels, led by Widukind. He succeeds in wiping out more than half of the occupying Frankish forces and again raises the banner of revolt.
- Autumn – Charlemagne returns from his campaign in Italy, and musters a Frankish army of available troops in Bavaria. He then marches to Saxony, probably to Eresburg. Charlemagne marches north, down the Weser to the Aller River, making camp near Verden.
- Massacre of Verden: Charlemagne executes 4,500 rebel Saxons at Verden for practicing paganism. He issues the Capitulatio de partibus Saxoniae and imposes Christianity on the Saxons, making Saxony a Frankish province.
- Charlemagne summons Alcuin, Anglo-Saxon missionary, to Aachen, and appoints him as chief adviser on religious and educational matters. He becomes the leading scholar and teacher at the Carolingian court.

==== By topic ====
====== Religion ======
- Nanchan Temple on Wutaishan, Shanxi, is built during the Tang Dynasty (China).

=== 783 ===
==== By place ====
====== Byzantine Empire ======
- A Byzantine expeditionary force under Staurakios, chief minister (logothete), begins a campaign against the communities (Sclaviniae) of Greece. Setting out from Constantinople, the imperial army follows the Thracian coast into Macedonia, and then south into Thessaly, Central Greece and the Peloponnese. Staurakios restores a measure of Byzantine authority over these areas, and collects booty and tribute from the locals.

====== Europe ======
- Mauregatus of Asturias, illegitimate son of the late king Alfonso I, usurps the throne after the death of his brother-in-law Silo. However, the nobility has elected Alfonso II at Adosinda's (wife of Silo) insistence, but Mauregatus assembles a large army of supporters, and forces Alfonso to flee to Álava (modern Spain). Adosinda is put in the monastery of San Juan de Pravia, where she lives out the rest of her life.
- April 30 – Hildegard, wife of King Charlemagne, dies in childbirth after her ninth confinement in less than 12 years of marriage. His mother, Bertrada of Laon, dies in the summer and is buried with great ceremony beside her husband Pepin the Short, in the Abbey of St. Denis (modern-day Paris).
- October – Charlemagne marries Fastrada, the 18-year-old daughter of a Frankish count named Rudolph, and makes her his queen at Worms. The probable reason behind the marriage is to solidify a Frankish alliance east of the Rhine, against the Saxons in Lower Saxony (modern Germany).
- Winter – Saxon Wars: Charlemagne defeats the Saxon rebels in a three-day battle next to the Hase River, and perhaps overruns fortifications on the Wittekindsberg, before ravaging southern Saxony. A Frisian uprising against Carolingian rule is supported by Duke Widukind.

=== 784 ===
==== By place ====
====== Europe ======
- Saxon Wars: King Charlemagne begins a campaign in northern Saxony. He ravages Eastphalian territory as far as the Elbe River, while his son, Charles the Younger, defeats a Saxon force in the Lippe Valley. Bad weather hinders Charlemagne's winter campaign in southern Saxony.
- Winter – Charlemagne returns to Eresburg and builds a church, probably on the site of the Irminsul (a pagan religious site). Frankish forces based at Eresburg attack rebel Saxon settlements, and take control of the roads. Charlemagne himself takes part in some of these raids.

====== Arabian Empire ======
- Abd al-Rahman I, Muslim emir of Córdoba (Al-Andalus), begins the construction of the Prayer Hall of the Great Mosque of Córdoba. He uses the mosque (originally called Aljama Mosque) as an adjunct to his palace, and names it in honour of his wife.

====== Asia ======
- The Japanese begin a war against the Ainu, in the north, on the main island of Honshu. Emperor Kanmu wishes to be free from the influence of the Buddhist monasteries around Nara (then called Heijō), and moves the capital to Nagaoka, ending the Nara period.
- Nagaoka-kyō becomes the Japanese imperial capital.

====== Central America ======
- February 4 – Itzamnaaj K'awiil, brother of Bat K'awiil (who reigned between 780 and 784) and the son of K'ahk' Ukalaw Chan Chaak (who ruled 755 to 780) becomes the new ruler of the Mayan city state of Naranjo in Guatemala and reigns until his death in 810.

==== By topic ====
====== Religion ======
- August 30 – Paul IV abdicates as patriarch of Constantinople.
- December 25 – Tarasios is elected patriarch of Constantinople.

=== 785 ===
==== By place ====
====== Europe ======
- Saxon Wars: King Charlemagne summons a major assembly of Saxon and Frankish lords at Paderborn, then leads his army across Saxony as far as the Lower Elbe, without significant resistance. Duke Widukind retreats with his 'rebel' forces beyond the Elbe, but then negotiates and exchanges hostages. Charlemagne returns to his palace at Attigny (Ardennes), followed by Widukind; here the Saxon leaders are baptized as Christians on Christmas Day. Widukind and the Saxon nobility swear fealty to Charlemagne.
- The Frankish Kingdom conquers Girona and Urgell (modern Spain) from the Moors. The Franks divide Catalonia into 14 countships. Charlemagne suppresses a rebellion by count Hardrad of Thuringia.
- Prince (or duke) Višeslav, with the support of Pope Adrian I and the Byzantine Empire, becomes ruler of Dalmatian Croatia (approximate date).

====== Britain ======
- King Offa of Mercia re-asserts his control of Kent, deposes his rival Egbert II, and establishes direct Mercian rule. Egbert's brother, Eadberht Præn, flees to the court of Charlemagne.

====== Arabian Empire ======
- Caliph Muhammad ibn Mansur al-Mahdi is poisoned by one of his concubines. He is succeeded by his son Al-Hadi, who becomes the fourth ruler of the Abbasid Caliphate.

====== Asia ======
- Fujiwara no Tanetsugu, Japanese nobleman (chūnagon), has his daughter Azumako married to the 12-year-old crown prince Heizei (son of Emperor Kanmu). While supervising construction of the buildings in the capital of Nagaoka, he is killed by an arrow.

==== By topic ====
====== Religion ======
- Council of Paderborn: The clergy debates the matter of the Christianization of the Saxons. They make laws against idolatry, and order the death penalty for self-appointed witch-hunters, who have caused the death of people accused of witchcraft.
- Ludger, Frisian missionary, visits Heligoland (Fossitesland), and destroys the remains of paganism. On his return he meets the blind bard Bernlef, last of the Frisian skalds, and cures his blindness (approximate date).

=== 786 ===
==== By place ====
====== Europe ======
- King Charles the Younger, son of Charlemagne and ruler of Aquitaine, visits Monte Cassino and Capua, both in Beneventan territory. Prince Arechis II, feeling threatened by the Franks, decides that he needs to stop quarrelling with the Byzantine Duchy of Naples so he can focus on the Frankish foe. Prince Arechis II therefore signs a peace agreement, or 'pactum', with the Duchy of Naples.

====== Britain ======
- Cyneheard, brother of the late king Sigeberht, ambushes and kills his rival Cynewulf of Wessex, while he is at Meretun (now called Marten) with his mistress. The Wessex nobles refuse to recognise Cyneheard as king.
- Cyneheard is executed and succeeded by Beorhtric, through the support of King Offa of Mercia. His rival claimant to the Wessex throne, a distant nephew of the late king Ine, named Egbert, is driven across the Channel.
- Egbert settles at the court of Charlemagne, and learns the arts of government during his time in Gaul. During his stay he meets Eadberht, a priest, who later becomes king of Kent.

====== Abbasid Caliphate ======
- June 11 – Battle of Fakhkh: An Alid uprising in Medina is crushed by the Abbasids. One of the Alids, Idris ibn Abdallah, flees to the Maghreb in western North Africa, where he later founds the Idrisid dynasty in 788/789.
- September 14 – Harun al-Rashid becomes the Abbasid caliph in Baghdad, upon the death of his brother Al-Hadi. He appoints Salim Yunisi as governor of Sindh and the Indus Valley.

==== By topic ====
====== Religion ======
- Beatus of Liébana, monk and theologian, publishes his Commentary on the Apocalypse.

=== 787 ===
==== By place ====
====== Byzantine Empire ======
- Empress Irene sends a Byzantine expeditionary army to invade southern Italy, but it is defeated and driven out (at Pope Adrian I's urging) by the Frankish army, allied with the forces of Benevento. She breaks off the engagement (see 782) between her son Constantine VI and the Frankish princess Rotrude, daughter of King Charlemagne.

====== Europe ======
- August 26 – Arechis II, autonomous prince (or duke) of Benevento, dies. Grimoald III, taken hostage by the Franks, succeeds his father as ruler of Benevento.
- Maurizio Galbaio, doge of Venice, dies after a 22-year reign and is succeeded by his son Giovanni. He begins a vendetta against the patriarch of Grado (Italy).

====== Britain ======
- Kings Offa of Mercia and Beorhtric of Wessex call the Synod of Chelsea in Kent, which is attended by the Papal legates. There, Offa persuades the Papacy to grant Archepiscopal status to the Mercian See of Lichfield. In order to secure the royal succession, he has Hygeberht crown his son Ecgfrith king of Mercia at Brixworth.

==== By topic ====
====== Religion ======
- Second Council of Nicaea: Empress Irene restores the veneration of icons (images of Christ and saints). This is a major victory of the monks, who will advance extensive claims to complete freedom for the Eastern Orthodox Church in religious matters. This ends the iconoclastic period in the Byzantine Empire.

=== 788 ===
==== By place ====
====== Byzantine Empire ======
- September – Battle of Kopidnadon: An Abbasid expeditionary force crosses the Cilician Gates into the Anatolic Theme (modern Turkey). It is confronted by two Byzantine armies at Podandos in Cappadocia, who are defeated.
- Byzantine troops led by Adalgis, son of former Lombard king Desiderius, invade southern Italy. His attempts are thwarted by the Franks, who attack territories in Benevento, obtaining notably the annexion of Chieti (Spoleto).

====== Europe ======
- King Charlemagne conquers Bavaria, and incorporates it into the Frankish Kingdom. Duke Tassilo III is deposed, and banished to a monastery.
- Grimoald III, Lombard duke of Benevento, is installed as semi-client by King Charles the Younger (son of Charlemagne) at Benevento (Italy).
- The Avars, who are allied with Tassilo III, invade East Francia (modern Germany). This begins the Frankish-Avar conflict.
- King Mauregatus of Asturias dies after a 5-year reign, and is succeeded by Bermudo I as ruler of Asturias (modern Spain).
- Abd al-Rahman I, emir of Córdoba, dies after a 32-year reign and is succeeded by his son Hisham I.
- The earliest recorded tornado in Europe struck Freising in 788.

====== Britain ======
- King Ælfwald I of Northumbria is murdered, probably at Chesters, by the patricius (ealdorman) Sicga. He is succeeded by his cousin Osred II.

====== Abbasid Caliphate ======
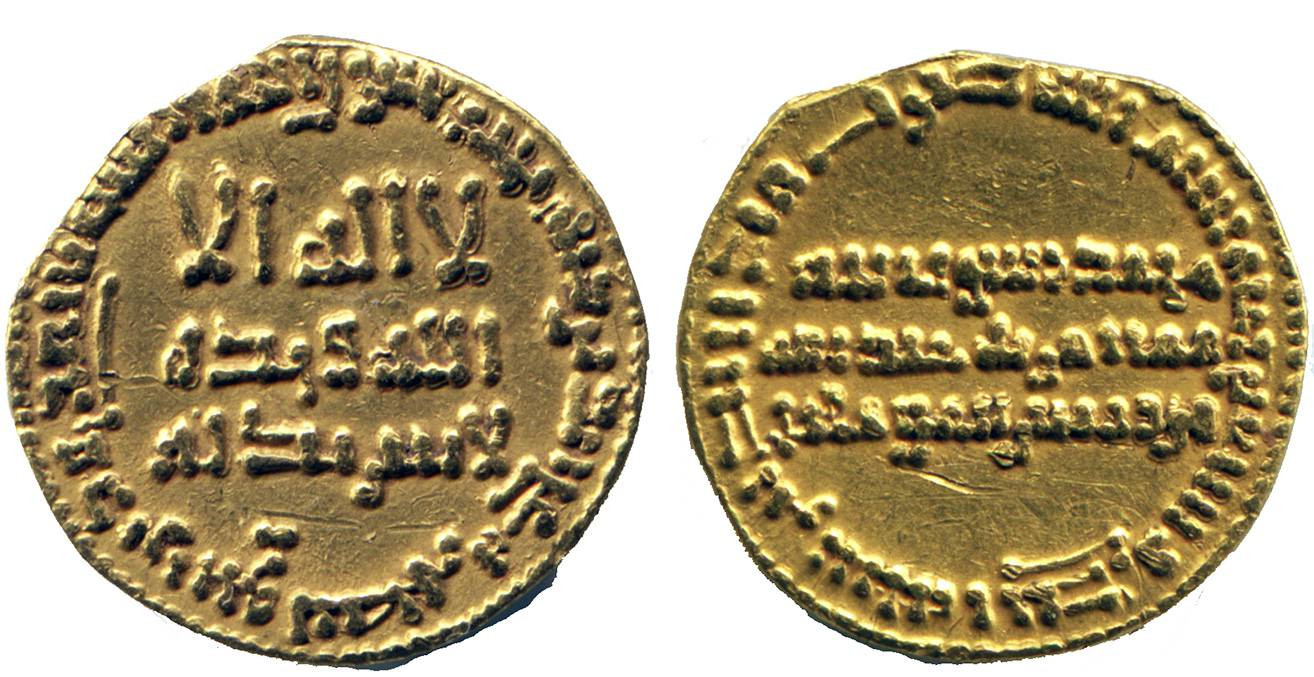
Gold dinar of caliph Harun al-Rashid dated AH 171 (AD 788)

- September – Battle of Kopidnadon: An Abbasid expeditionary force against the Byzantine Empire crosses the Cilician Gates into the Anatolic Theme. The Abbasid army launches an invasion of Byzantine Asia Minor, and is confronted by a Byzantine force at Kopidnadon. The battle results in an Abbasid victory.
- Idris ibn Abdallah, known as the "founder of Morocco", settles in Volubilis, beginning the reign of the Idrisid Dynasty (Morocco had effectively been independent from the Arab caliphates since the Great Berber Revolt).

==== By topic ====
====== Religion ======
- The period covered in Adam of Bremen's historical treatise of the Archbishopric of Hamburg begins.
- The Enryaku-ji temple complex is founded by Saichō, a Buddhist monk, on Mount Hiei in Ōtsu (Japan).

=== 789 ===
==== By place ====
====== Europe ======
- King Charlemagne crosses the Elbe River with a Frankish-Saxon army into Obotrite territory. He subdues the Wiltzes, and reaches the Baltic.
- King Pepin of Italy conquers Istria on the Adriatic, ignoring Byzantine protests. He establishes a tributary march, and sends missionaries.
- Charlemagne issues the Admonitio generalis, which covers educational and ecclesiastical reforms within the Frankish Kingdom.
- Charlemagne founds the town of Herford (modern Germany), in order to guard a ford crossing the narrow Werre River.

====== Britain ======
- King Beorhtric of Wessex marries Princess Eadburh, daughter of King Offa of Mercia, and accepts Mercian overlordship.
- Constantine I is installed as king of the Picts. He becomes one of the greatest Scottish monarchs in the Viking period.
- The Anglo-Saxon Chronicle records the first appearance of Vikings in England. The Viking raid on Portland in Dorset is the first of its kind recorded in the British Isles, including Ireland. The reeve of Dorchester (a local high-ranking official) goes to greet them after they land, perhaps accustomed to welcoming Scandinavian merchants. He is killed. Viking attacks increase in intensity over the coming decades.

====== Islamic Caliphate ======
- Al-Khayzuran, widow of former Abbasid caliph Al-Mahdi, dies, leaving more of the effective and real power in the hands of Harun al-Rashid.
- Idris I reaches Volubilis and founds the Idrisid dynasty, ceding Morocco from the Abbasid caliphate and founding the first Moroccan state.

====== Asia ======
- An uprising in Japan leads to a major defeat for Emperor Kanmu, along with a severe drought and famine; the streets of the capital Nagaoka-kyō are clogged with the sick.

== Significant people ==
- Al-Mahdi Abbasid caliph
- Al-Hadi Abbasid caliph
- Harun al-Rashid
- Alcuin
- Charlemagne
- Al-Khayzuran
- Zubaidah bint Ja'far
- Abd al-Rahman I

== Births ==
780

- Ahmad ibn Hanbal, Muslim scholar and theologian (d. 855)
- Frederick of Utrecht, Frisian bishop (approximate date)
- Guifeng Zongmi, Chinese Buddhist monk (d. 841)
- Hugh of Tours, Frankish nobleman (approximate date)
- Muḥammad ibn Mūsā al-Ḵwārizmī, Persian mathematician (approximate date)
- Rabanus Maurus, archbishop of Mainz (approximate date)
- Yunyan Tansheng, Chinese Buddhist monk (d. 841)

781

- Harith al-Muhasibi, founder of the Baghdad School of Islamic philosophy, and a teacher of the Sufi masters Junayd al-Baghdadi and Sari al-Saqti (d. 857)

782

- Tachibana no Hayanari, Japanese calligrapher (d. 844)

783

- Wu Yuanji, general of the Tang Dynasty (or 793)

784

- Ibn Sa'd al-Baghdadi, Muslim historian (d. 845)
- Li Jue, chancellor of the Tang Dynasty (approximate date)
- Theodrada, Frankish princess and abbess, daughter of Charlemagne (approximate date)

785

- Antony the Younger, Byzantine saint (d. 865)
- Harald Klak, king of Denmark (approximate date)
- Junna, emperor of Japan (approximate date)
- Paschasius Radbertus, Frankish abbot (d. 865)
- Tian Bu, general of the Tang dynasty (d. 822)
- Zhang Yunshen, general of the Tang dynasty (d. 872)

786

- October 10 – Saga, emperor of Japan (d. 842)
- Adelochus, archbishop of Strasbourg (d. 823)
- Al-Ḥajjāj ibn Yūsuf ibn Maṭar, Muslim mathematician (d. 833)
- Al-Ma'mun, Muslim caliph (d. 833)
- Sahl ibn Bishr, Muslim astrologer (approximate date)
- Tachibana no Kachiko, empress of Japan (d. 850)

787

- Abu Ma'shar al-Balkhi, Muslim scholar and astrologer (approximate date)
- Li Deyu, chancellor of the Tang Dynasty (d. 850)
- Muhammad ibn Harun al-Amin, Muslim caliph (d. 813)

788

- Abu Tammam, Muslim poet (d. 845)
- Adi Shankara, Indian philosopher and theologian (d. 832)
- Aejang, king of Silla (Korea) (d. 809)
- Al-Zubayr ibn Bakkar, Muslim historian (d. 870)
- Ida of Herzfeld, Frankish duchess and saint (approximate date)
- Li Zaiyi, general of the Tang Dynasty (d. 837)
- Methodios I, patriarch of Constantinople (or 800)

789

- Lu Shang, chancellor of the Tang Dynasty (d. 859)
- Ziryab, Muslim poet and musician (d. 857)

== Deaths ==
780

- c. June 24 – Kume no Wakame, Japanese noblewoman
- August 19 – Credan, English abbot and saint
- September 8 – Leo IV, Byzantine emperor (b. 750)
- Dunchadh ua Daimhine, king of Uí Maine (Ireland)
- Hyegong, king of Silla (Korea) (b. 758)
- Khun Lo, founder of Luang Prabang (Laos)
- Approximate date – Himiltrude, queen consort of Charlemagne (b. c.742)

781

- Alchmund, bishop of Hexham (approximate date)
- King Fergus mac Echdach of Dál Riata (Scotland)
- Guo Ziyi, general of the Tang dynasty (b. 697)
- Isonokami no Yakatsugu, Japanese nobleman (b. 723)
- Yang Yan, chancellor of the Tang dynasty (b. 727)

782

- January 11 – Kōnin, emperor of Japan (b. 709)
- September 28 – Leoba, Anglo-Saxon nun
- Conall mac Fidhghal, king of Uí Maine (Ireland)
- Thierry IV, Frankish nobleman (approximate date)

783

- April 30 – Hildegard, queen consort of Charlemagne (b. 758)
- July 12 – Bertrada of Laon, queen consort of Pepin the Short
- Cynewulf, bishop of Lindisfarne (approximate date)
- Fujiwara no Uona, Japanese minister (b. 721)
- Han Gan, Chinese painter of the Tang Dynasty
- Isa ibn Musa, Muslim governor (or 784)
- Silo, king of Asturias (Spain)

784

- May 4 – Arbeo, bishop of Freising
- July 16 – Fulrad, Frankish abbot (b. 710)
- August 21 – Alberic, archbishop of Utrecht
- Autpert Ambrose, Frankish abbot
- Isa ibn Musa, Muslim governor (or 783)
- Paul IV, patriarch of Constantinople
- Vergilius, bishop of Salzburg

785

- October 5- Ōtomo no Yakamochi, Japanese statesman and poet, Shōgun
- November 8 – Sawara, Japanese prince
- Al-Rabi' ibn Yunus, Muslim minister (or 786)
- Fujiwara no Tanetsugu, Japanese nobleman (b. 737)
- K'ak' Tiliw Chan Yopaat, king of Quiriguá (Guatemala)
- Li Huaiguang, general of the Tang dynasty (b. 729)
- Liu Changqing, Chinese poet (b. 709)
- Liu Congyi, chancellor of the Tang dynasty (b. 742)
- Liu Peng, general of the Tang dynasty (b. 727)
- Máel Dúin mac Fergusa, king of Brega (Ireland)
- Muhammad ibn Mansur al-Mahdi, Muslim Caliph
- Ruaidrí mac Fáeláin, king of Leinster (Ireland)
- Seondeok, king of Silla (Korea)
- Talorgan II, king of the Picts
- Tatzates, Byzantine general
- Theophilus of Edessa, Greek astrologer (b. 695)
- Yan Zhenqing, Chinese calligrapher (b. 709)
- Zhu Tao, general of the Tang dynasty

786

- June 11 – Al-Husayn ibn Ali al-Abid, anti-Abbasid rebel leader
- September 14 – Al-Hadi, Muslim caliph (b. 764)
- September – Marajil, mother of caliph al-Ma'mun.
- October 16 – Lullus, archbishop of Mainz
- Abo of Tiflis, Christian martyr
- Al-Rabi' ibn Yunus, Muslim minister (or 785)
- Cyneheard the Ætheling, nobleman of Wessex
- Cynewulf, king of Wessex
- Desiderius, king of the Lombards (approximate date)
- Diarmait mac Conaing, king of South Brega (Ireland)
- Sakanoue no Karitamaro, Japanese general (b. 727)
- Tipraiti mac Taidg, king of Connacht (Ireland)
- Empress Wang (Dezong) of China

787

- August 26 – Arechis II, duke of Benevento
- December 13 – Agilfride, bishop of Liège
- Hyecho, Korean Buddhist monk (b. 704)
- Maurizio Galbaio, doge of Venice
- Willibald, bishop of Eichstätt (approximate date)

788

- September 23 – Ælfwald I, king of Northumbria
- Abd al-Rahman I, Muslim emir of Córdoba (b. 731)
- Adalgis, king and co-regent of the Lombards
- Hnabi, duke of the Alemanni (approximate date)
- Mauregatus, king of Asturias (or 789)
- Mazu Daoyi, Chinese Zen Buddhist monk (b. 709)
- Ōnakatomi no Kiyomaro, Japanese nobleman (b. 702)

789

- February 20 – Leo of Catania, saint and bishop of Catania (b. 709)
- November 8 – Willehad, bishop of Bremen
- Al-Khayzuran, powerful wife and adviser of Abbasid caliph Al-Mahdi and the excellent mother of Al-Hadi and Harun Al-Rashid, the Abbasid caliphs, de facto co-ruler of the Abbasid Caliphate
- Fiachnae mac Áedo Róin, king of Ulaid (Ireland)
- Amat al-Aziz Ghadir, was the mother of Abbasid prince; Ali ibn Harun al-Rashid.
- Hildeprand, duke of Spoleto
- Mauregatus, king of Asturias (or 788)
- Muhammad ibn Sulayman ibn Ali, Abbasid prince and provincial governor
- Torson, Frankish count of Toulouse (or 790)
