= 782 =

Calendar year

782 in various calendars
Gregorian calendar	782; DCCLXXXII
Ab urbe condita	1535
Armenian calendar	231; ԹՎ ՄԼԱ
Assyrian calendar	5532
Balinese saka calendar	703–704
Bengali calendar	188–189
Berber calendar	1732
Buddhist calendar	1326
Burmese calendar	144
Byzantine calendar	6290–6291
Chinese calendar	辛酉年 (Metal Rooster); 3479 or 3272 — to — 壬戌年 (Water Dog); 3480 or 3273
Coptic calendar	498–499
Discordian calendar	1948
Ethiopian calendar	774–775
Hebrew calendar	4542–4543
- Hindu calendars
Vikram Samvat	838–839
Shaka Samvat	703–704
Kali Yuga	3882–3883
Holocene calendar	10782
Iranian calendar	160–161
Islamic calendar	165–166
Japanese calendar	Ten'ō 2 / Enryaku 1 (延暦元年)
Javanese calendar	677–678
Julian calendar	782; DCCLXXXII
Korean calendar	3115
Minguo calendar	1130 before ROC 民前1130年
Nanakshahi calendar	−686
Seleucid era	1093/1094 AG
Thai solar calendar	1324–1325
Tibetan calendar	阴金鸡年 (female Iron-Rooster); 908 or 527 or −245 — to — 阳水狗年 (male Water-Dog); 909 or 528 or −244

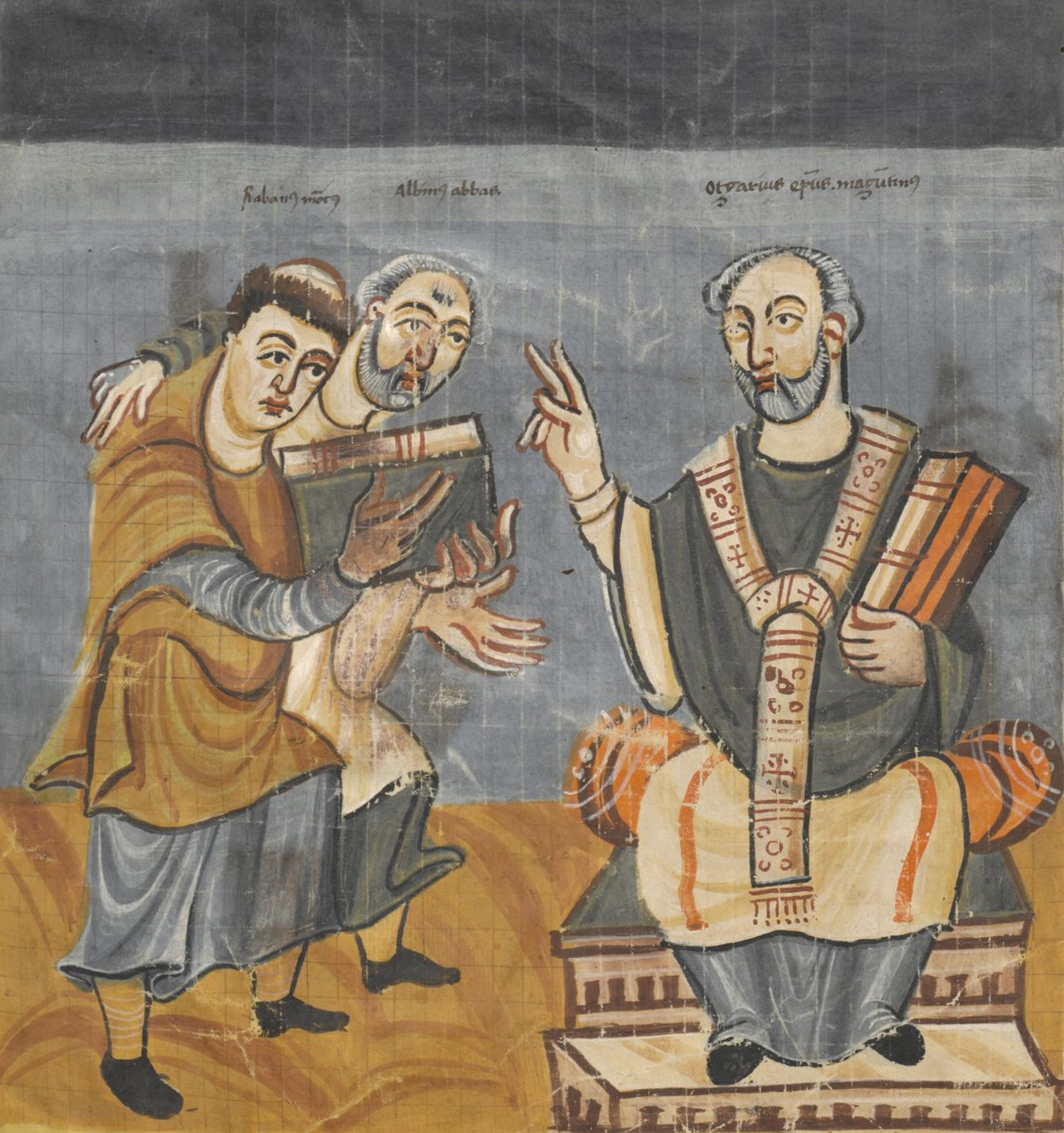
Rabanus Maurus (left), with Alcuin (middle), presents his work to archbishop Odgar (right)

Year 782 (DCCLXXXII) was a common year starting on Tuesday of the Julian calendar, the 782nd year of the Common Era (CE) and Anno Domini (AD) designations, the 782nd year of the 1st millennium, the 82nd year of the 8th century, and the 3rd year of the 780s decade. The denomination 782 for this year has been used since the early medieval period, when the Anno Domini calendar era became the prevalent method in Europe for naming years.

== Events ==
=== By place ===
==== Abbasid Empire ====
- Arab–Byzantine War: Arab forces (95,000 men) under Harun al-Rashid, son of the Abbasid caliph Al-Mahdi, cross the Taurus Mountains and capture the Byzantine border fortress of Magida. Harun leaves his lieutenant Al-Rabi' ibn Yunus to besiege the city of Nakoleia (Phrygia), while another force (30,000 men), probably under Yahya ibn Khalid, is sent to raid the western coastlands of Asia Minor. Harun himself, with the main army, advances to the Opsician Theme.
- Summer – Harun al-Rashid reaches as far as Chrysopolis, across the Bosporus Straits from the Byzantine capital, Constantinople. After the defection of the Armenian general Tatzates, Empress Irene accepts a three-year truce, including the annual payment of a tribute of 70,000 or 90,000 gold dinars, and the handing over of 10,000 silk garments. Harun releases all his captives (5,600 men), including chief minister Staurakios and other hostages.

==== Byzantine Empire ====
- Emperor Constantine VI is betrothed to the 6-year-old Rotrude, daughter of Charlemagne; Irene sends a scholar monk called Elisaeus to educate her in Greek language and manners.

==== Europe ====
- Summer – Saxon Wars: King Charlemagne sends a punitive expedition (an elite force of Eastern Frankish troops) under the command of Adalgis the Chamberlain, Gallo, and Worad, supported by Saxon forces, to deal with the Saxons and Sorb raiders in Thuringia.
- Battle of Süntel: The Franks under Charlemagne are defeated by Saxon rebels, led by Widukind. He succeeds in wiping out more than half of the occupying Frankish forces and again raises the banner of revolt.
- Autumn – Charlemagne returns from his campaign in Italy, and musters a Frankish army of available troops in Bavaria. He then marches to Saxony, probably to Eresburg. Charlemagne marches north, down the Weser to the Aller River, making camp near Verden.
- Massacre of Verden: Charlemagne executes 4,500 rebel Saxons at Verden for practicing paganism. He issues the Capitulatio de partibus Saxoniae and imposes Christianity on the Saxons, making Saxony a Frankish province.
- Charlemagne summons Alcuin, Anglo-Saxon missionary, to Aachen, and appoints him as chief adviser on religious and educational matters. He becomes the leading scholar and teacher at the Carolingian court.

=== By topic ===
==== Religion ====
- Nanchan Temple on Wutaishan, Shanxi, is built during the Tang Dynasty (China).

== Births ==
- Tachibana no Hayanari, Japanese calligrapher (d. 844)

== Deaths ==
- January 11 – Kōnin, emperor of Japan (b. 709)
- September 28 – Leoba, Anglo-Saxon nun
- Conall mac Fidhghal, king of Uí Maine (Ireland)
- Thierry IV, Frankish nobleman (approximate date)
