= 786 =

Calendar year

786 in various calendars
Gregorian calendar	786; DCCLXXXVI
Ab urbe condita	1539
Armenian calendar	235; ԹՎ ՄԼԵ
Assyrian calendar	5536
Balinese saka calendar	707–708
Bengali calendar	192–193
Berber calendar	1736
Buddhist calendar	1330
Burmese calendar	148
Byzantine calendar	6294–6295
Chinese calendar	乙丑年 (Wood Ox); 3483 or 3276 — to — 丙寅年 (Fire Tiger); 3484 or 3277
Coptic calendar	502–503
Discordian calendar	1952
Ethiopian calendar	778–779
Hebrew calendar	4546–4547
- Hindu calendars
Vikram Samvat	842–843
Shaka Samvat	707–708
Kali Yuga	3886–3887
Holocene calendar	10786
Iranian calendar	164–165
Islamic calendar	169–170
Japanese calendar	Enryaku 5 (延暦５年)
Javanese calendar	681–682
Julian calendar	786; DCCLXXXVI
Korean calendar	3119
Minguo calendar	1126 before ROC 民前1126年
Nanakshahi calendar	−682
Seleucid era	1097/1098 AG
Thai solar calendar	1328–1329
Tibetan calendar	ཤིང་མོ་གླང་ལོ་ (female Wood-Ox); 912 or 531 or −241 — to — མེ་ཕོ་སྟག་ལོ་ (male Fire-Tiger); 913 or 532 or −240

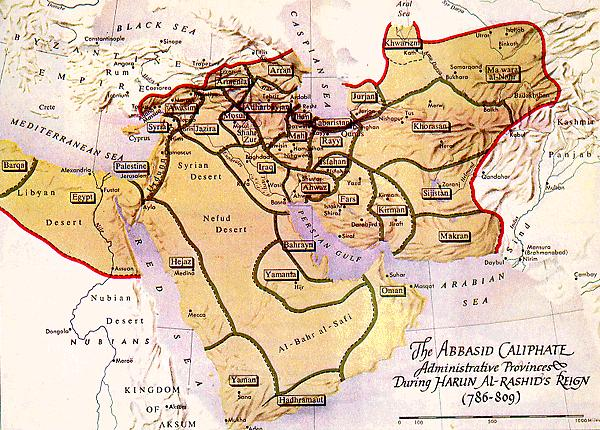
The Abbasid Caliphate with provinces (786)

Year 786 (DCCLXXXVI) was a common year starting on Sunday of the Julian calendar, the 786th year of the Common Era (CE) and Anno Domini (AD) designations, the 786th year of the 1st millennium, the 86th year of the 8th century, and the 7th year of the 780s decade. The denomination 786 for this year has been used since the early medieval period, when the Anno Domini calendar era became the prevalent method in Europe for naming years.

== Events ==
=== By place ===
==== Europe ====
- King Charles the Younger, son of Charlemagne and ruler of Aquitaine, visits Monte Cassino and Capua, both in Beneventan territory. Prince Arechis II, feeling threatened by the Franks, decides that he needs to stop quarrelling with the Byzantine Duchy of Naples so he can focus on the Frankish foe. Prince Arechis II therefore signs a peace agreement, or 'pactum', with the Duchy of Naples.

==== Britain ====
- Cyneheard, brother of the late king Sigeberht, ambushes and kills his rival Cynewulf of Wessex, while he is at Meretun (now called Marten) with his mistress. The Wessex nobles refuse to recognise Cyneheard as king.
- Cyneheard is executed and succeeded by Beorhtric, through the support of King Offa of Mercia. His rival claimant to the Wessex throne, a distant nephew of the late king Ine, named Egbert, is driven across the Channel.
- Egbert settles at the court of Charlemagne, and learns the arts of government during his time in Gaul. During his stay he meets Eadberht, a priest, who later becomes king of Kent.

==== Abbasid Caliphate ====
- June 11 – Battle of Fakhkh: An Alid uprising in Medina is crushed by the Abbasids. One of the Alids, Idris ibn Abdallah, flees to the Maghreb in western North Africa, where he later founds the Idrisid dynasty in 788/789.
- September 14 – Harun al-Rashid becomes the Abbasid caliph in Baghdad, upon the death of his brother Al-Hadi. He appoints Salim Yunisi as governor of Sindh and the Indus Valley.

=== By topic ===
==== Religion ====
- Beatus of Liébana, monk and theologian, publishes his Commentary on the Apocalypse.

== Births ==
- October 10 – Saga, emperor of Japan (d. 842)
- Adelochus, archbishop of Strasbourg (d. 823)
- Al-Ḥajjāj ibn Yūsuf ibn Maṭar, Muslim mathematician (d. 833)
- Al-Ma'mun, Muslim caliph (d. 833)
- Sahl ibn Bishr, Muslim astrologer (approximate date)
- Tachibana no Kachiko, empress of Japan (d. 850)

== Deaths ==
- June 11 – Al-Husayn ibn Ali al-Abid, anti-Abbasid rebel leader
- September 14 – Al-Hadi, Muslim caliph (b. 764)
- September – Marajil, mother of caliph al-Ma'mun.
- October 16 – Lullus, archbishop of Mainz
- Abo of Tiflis, Christian martyr
- Al-Rabi' ibn Yunus, Muslim minister (or 785)
- Cyneheard the Ætheling, nobleman of Wessex
- Cynewulf, king of Wessex
- Desiderius, king of the Lombards (approximate date)
- Diarmait mac Conaing, king of South Brega (Ireland)
- Sakanoue no Karitamaro, Japanese general (b. 727)
- Tipraiti mac Taidg, king of Connacht (Ireland)
- Empress Wang (Dezong) of China
