= 785 =

Calendar year

785 in various calendars
- Gregorian calendar: 785; DCCLXXXV
- Ab urbe condita: 1538
- Armenian calendar: 234; ԹՎ ՄԼԴ
- Assyrian calendar: 5535
- Balinese saka calendar: 706–707
- Bengali calendar: 191–192
- Berber calendar: 1735
- Buddhist calendar: 1329
- Burmese calendar: 147
- Byzantine calendar: 6293–6294
- Chinese calendar: 甲子年 (Wood Rat); 3482 or 3275 — to — 乙丑年 (Wood Ox); 3483 or 3276
- Coptic calendar: 501–502
- Discordian calendar: 1951
- Ethiopian calendar: 777–778
- Hebrew calendar: 4545–4546
- Hindu calendars
- Vikram Samvat: 841–842
- Shaka Samvat: 706–707
- Kali Yuga: 3885–3886
- Holocene calendar: 10785
- Iranian calendar: 163–164
- Islamic calendar: 168–169
- Japanese calendar: Enryaku 4 (延暦４年)
- Javanese calendar: 680–681
- Julian calendar: 785; DCCLXXXV
- Korean calendar: 3118
- Minguo calendar: 1127 before ROC 民前1127年
- Nanakshahi calendar: −683
- Seleucid era: 1096/1097 AG
- Thai solar calendar: 1327–1328
- Tibetan calendar: ཤིང་ཕོ་བྱི་བ་ལོ་ (male Wood-Rat); 911 or 530 or −242 — to — ཤིང་མོ་གླང་ལོ་ (female Wood-Ox); 912 or 531 or −241

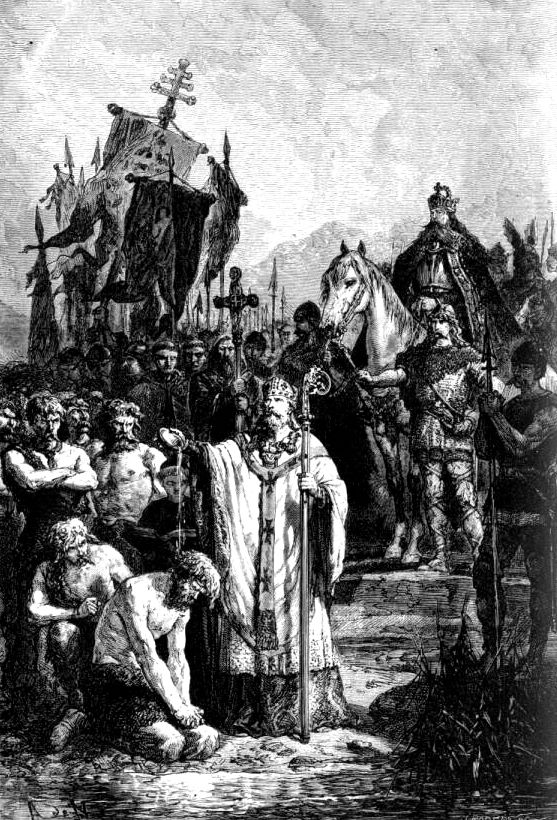
Conversion of the Saxons (c. 1869)

Year 785 (DCCLXXXV) was a common year starting on Saturday of the Julian calendar. The article denomination 785 for this year has been used since the early medieval period, when the Anno Domini calendar era became the prevalent method in Europe for naming years. It is still used today in this manner.

== Events ==
=== By place ===
==== Europe ====
- Saxon Wars: King Charlemagne summons a major assembly of Saxon and Frankish lords at Paderborn, then leads his army across Saxony as far as the Lower Elbe, without significant resistance. Duke Widukind retreats with his 'rebel' forces beyond the Elbe, but then negotiates and exchanges hostages. Charlemagne returns to his palace at Attigny (Ardennes), followed by Widukind; here the Saxon leaders are baptized as Christians on Christmas Day. Widukind and the Saxon nobility swear fealty to Charlemagne.
- The Frankish Kingdom conquers Girona and Urgell (modern Spain) from the Moors. The Franks divide Catalonia into 14 countships. Charlemagne suppresses a rebellion by count Hardrad of Thuringia.
- Prince (or duke) Višeslav, with the support of Pope Adrian I and the Byzantine Empire, becomes ruler of Dalmatian Croatia (approximate date).

==== Britain ====
- King Offa of Mercia re-asserts his control of Kent, deposes his rival Egbert II, and establishes direct Mercian rule. Egbert's brother, Eadberht Præn, flees to the court of Charlemagne.

==== Arabian Empire ====
- Caliph Muhammad ibn Mansur al-Mahdi is poisoned by one of his concubines. He is succeeded by his son Al-Hadi, who becomes the fourth ruler of the Abbasid Caliphate.

==== Asia ====
- Fujiwara no Tanetsugu, Japanese nobleman (chūnagon), has his daughter Azumako married to the 12-year-old crown prince Heizei (son of Emperor Kanmu). While supervising construction of the buildings in the capital of Nagaoka, he is killed by an arrow.

=== By topic ===
==== Religion ====
- Council of Paderborn: The clergy debates the matter of the Christianization of the Saxons. They make laws against idolatry, and order the death penalty for self-appointed witch-hunters, who have caused the death of people accused of witchcraft.
- Ludger, Frisian missionary, visits Heligoland (Fossitesland), and destroys the remains of paganism. On his return he meets the blind bard Bernlef, last of the Frisian skalds, and cures his blindness (approximate date).

== Births ==
- Antony the Younger, Byzantine saint (d. 865)
- Harald Klak, king of Denmark (approximate date)
- Junna, emperor of Japan (approximate date)
- Paschasius Radbertus, Frankish abbot (d. 865)
- Tian Bu, general of the Tang dynasty (d. 822)
- Zhang Yunshen, general of the Tang dynasty (d. 872)

== Deaths ==
- October 5- Ōtomo no Yakamochi, Japanese statesman and poet, Shōgun
- November 8 – Sawara, Japanese prince
- Al-Rabi' ibn Yunus, Muslim minister (or 786)
- Fujiwara no Tanetsugu, Japanese nobleman (b. 737)
- K'ak' Tiliw Chan Yopaat, king of Quiriguá (Guatemala)
- Li Huaiguang, general of the Tang dynasty (b. 729)
- Liu Changqing, Chinese poet (b. 709)
- Liu Congyi, chancellor of the Tang dynasty (b. 742)
- Liu Peng, general of the Tang dynasty (b. 727)
- Máel Dúin mac Fergusa, king of Brega (Ireland)
- Muhammad ibn Mansur al-Mahdi, Muslim Caliph
- Ruaidrí mac Fáeláin, king of Leinster (Ireland)
- Seondeok, king of Silla (Korea)
- Talorgan II, king of the Picts
- Tatzates, Byzantine general
- Theophilus of Edessa, Greek astrologer (b. 695)
- Yan Zhenqing, Chinese calligrapher (b. 709)
- Zhu Tao, general of the Tang dynasty
