= 788 =

Calendar year

788 in various calendars
- Gregorian calendar: 788; DCCLXXXVIII
- Ab urbe condita: 1541
- Armenian calendar: 237; ԹՎ ՄԼԷ
- Assyrian calendar: 5538
- Balinese saka calendar: 709–710
- Bengali calendar: 194–195
- Berber calendar: 1738
- Buddhist calendar: 1332
- Burmese calendar: 150
- Byzantine calendar: 6296–6297
- Chinese calendar: 丁卯年 (Fire Rabbit); 3485 or 3278 — to — 戊辰年 (Earth Dragon); 3486 or 3279
- Coptic calendar: 504–505
- Discordian calendar: 1954
- Ethiopian calendar: 780–781
- Hebrew calendar: 4548–4549
- Hindu calendars
- Vikram Samvat: 844–845
- Shaka Samvat: 709–710
- Kali Yuga: 3888–3889
- Holocene calendar: 10788
- Iranian calendar: 166–167
- Islamic calendar: 171–172
- Japanese calendar: Enryaku 7 (延暦７年)
- Javanese calendar: 683–684
- Julian calendar: 788; DCCLXXXVIII
- Korean calendar: 3121
- Minguo calendar: 1124 before ROC 民前1124年
- Nanakshahi calendar: −680
- Seleucid era: 1099/1100 AG
- Thai solar calendar: 1330–1331
- Tibetan calendar: མེ་མོ་ཡོས་ལོ་ (female Fire-Hare); 914 or 533 or −239 — to — ས་ཕོ་འབྲུག་ལོ་ (male Earth-Dragon); 915 or 534 or −238

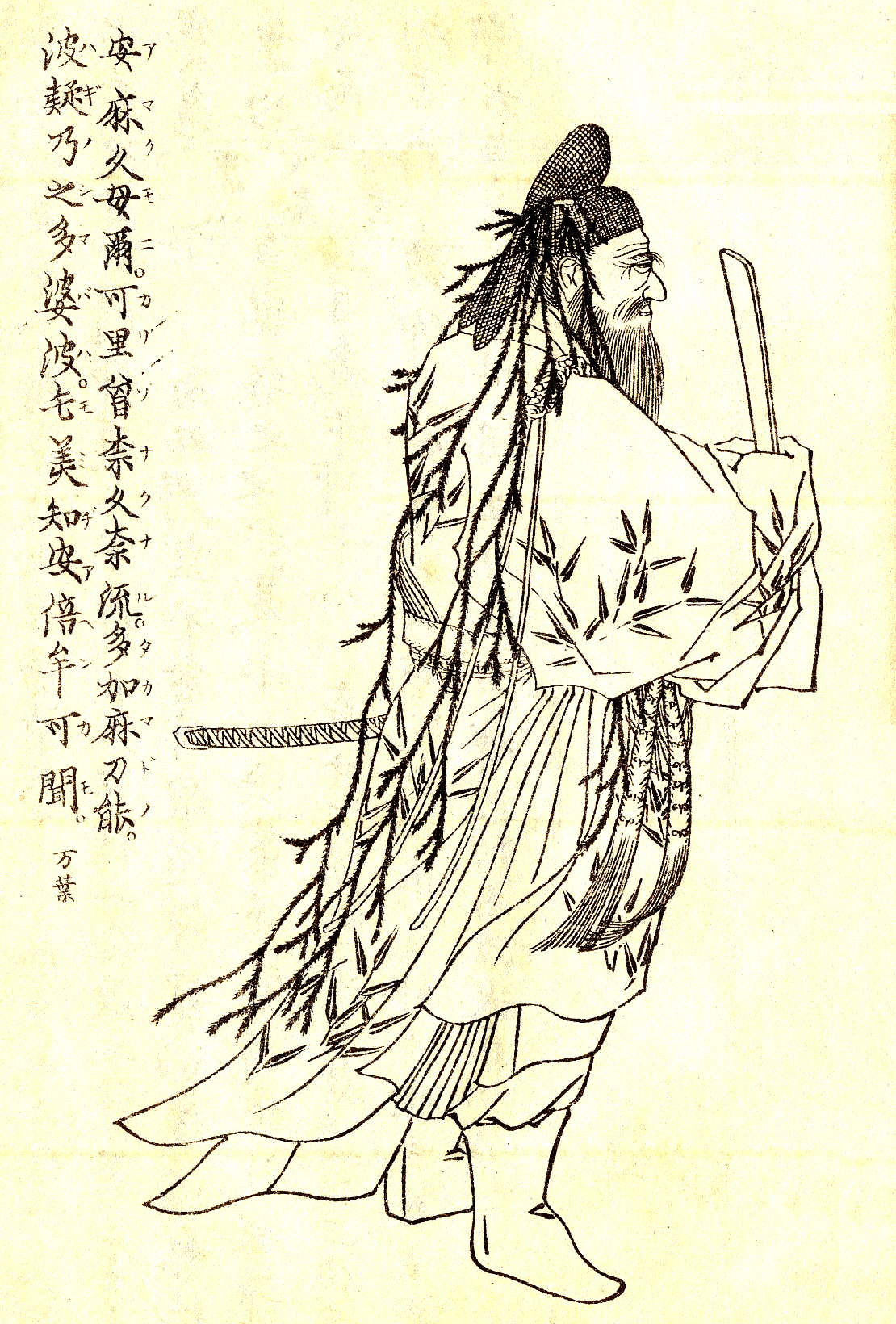
Ōnakatomi no Kiyomaro (702–788)

Year 788 (DCCLXXXVIII) was a leap year starting on Tuesday of the Julian calendar, the 788th year of the Common Era (CE) and Anno Domini (AD) designations, the 788th year of the 1st millennium, the 88th year of the 8th century, and the 9th year of the 780s decade. The denomination 788 for this year has been used since the early medieval period, when the Anno Domini calendar era became the prevalent method in Europe for naming years.

== Events ==
=== By place ===
==== Byzantine Empire ====
- September – Battle of Kopidnadon: An Abbasid expeditionary force crosses the Cilician Gates into the Anatolic Theme (modern Turkey). It is confronted by two Byzantine armies at Podandos in Cappadocia, who are defeated.
- Byzantine troops led by Adalgis, son of former Lombard king Desiderius, invade southern Italy. His attempts are thwarted by the Franks, who attack territories in Benevento, obtaining notably the annexion of Chieti (Spoleto).

==== Europe ====
- King Charlemagne conquers Bavaria, and incorporates it into the Frankish Kingdom. Duke Tassilo III is deposed, and banished to a monastery.
- Grimoald III, Lombard duke of Benevento, is installed as semi-client by King Charles the Younger (son of Charlemagne) at Benevento (Italy).
- The Avars, who are allied with Tassilo III, invade East Francia (modern Germany). This begins the Frankish-Avar conflict.
- King Mauregatus of Asturias dies after a 5-year reign, and is succeeded by Bermudo I as ruler of Asturias (modern Spain).
- Abd al-Rahman I, emir of Córdoba, dies after a 32-year reign and is succeeded by his son Hisham I.
- The earliest recorded tornado in Europe struck Freising in 788.

==== Britain ====
- King Ælfwald I of Northumbria is murdered, probably at Chesters, by the patricius (ealdorman) Sicga. He is succeeded by his cousin Osred II.

==== Abbasid Caliphate ====
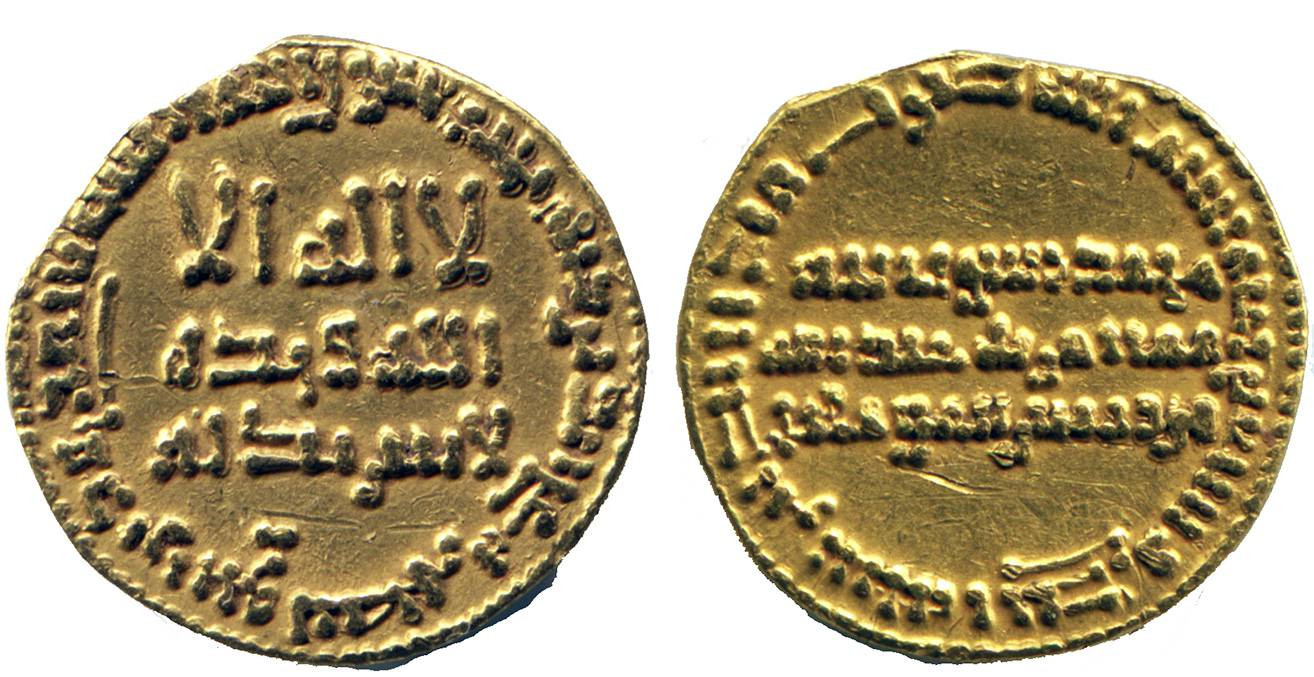
Gold dinar of caliph Harun al-Rashid dated AH 171 (AD 788)

- September – Battle of Kopidnadon: An Abbasid expeditionary force against the Byzantine Empire crosses the Cilician Gates into the Anatolic Theme. The Abbasid army launches an invasion of Byzantine Asia Minor, and is confronted by a Byzantine force at Kopidnadon. The battle results in an Abbasid victory.
- Idris ibn Abdallah, known as the "founder of Morocco", settles in Volubilis, beginning the reign of the Idrisid Dynasty (Morocco had effectively been independent from the Arab caliphates since the Great Berber Revolt).

=== By topic ===
==== Religion ====
- The period covered in Adam of Bremen's historical treatise of the Archbishopric of Hamburg begins.
- The Enryaku-ji temple complex is founded by Saichō, a Buddhist monk, on Mount Hiei in Ōtsu (Japan).

== Births ==
- Abu Tammam, Muslim poet (d. 845)
- Adi Shankara, Indian philosopher and theologian (d. 832)
- Aejang, king of Silla (Korea) (d. 809)
- Al-Zubayr ibn Bakkar, Muslim historian (d. 870)
- Ida of Herzfeld, Frankish duchess and saint (approximate date)
- Li Zaiyi, general of the Tang Dynasty (d. 837)
- Methodios I, patriarch of Constantinople (or 800)

== Deaths ==
- September 23 – Ælfwald I, king of Northumbria
- Abd al-Rahman I, Muslim emir of Córdoba (b. 731)
- Adalgis, king and co-regent of the Lombards
- Hnabi, duke of the Alemanni (approximate date)
- Mauregatus, king of Asturias (or 789)
- Mazu Daoyi, Chinese Zen Buddhist monk (b. 709)
- Ōnakatomi no Kiyomaro, Japanese nobleman (b. 702)
