= 784 =

Calendar year

784 in various calendars
- Gregorian calendar: 784; DCCLXXXIV
- Ab urbe condita: 1537
- Armenian calendar: 233; ԹՎ ՄԼԳ
- Assyrian calendar: 5534
- Balinese saka calendar: 705–706
- Bengali calendar: 190–191
- Berber calendar: 1734
- Buddhist calendar: 1328
- Burmese calendar: 146
- Byzantine calendar: 6292–6293
- Chinese calendar: 癸亥年 (Water Pig); 3481 or 3274 — to — 甲子年 (Wood Rat); 3482 or 3275
- Coptic calendar: 500–501
- Discordian calendar: 1950
- Ethiopian calendar: 776–777
- Hebrew calendar: 4544–4545
- Hindu calendars
- Vikram Samvat: 840–841
- Shaka Samvat: 705–706
- Kali Yuga: 3884–3885
- Holocene calendar: 10784
- Iranian calendar: 162–163
- Islamic calendar: 167–168
- Japanese calendar: Enryaku 3 (延暦３年)
- Javanese calendar: 679–680
- Julian calendar: 784; DCCLXXXIV
- Korean calendar: 3117
- Minguo calendar: 1128 before ROC 民前1128年
- Nanakshahi calendar: −684
- Seleucid era: 1095/1096 AG
- Thai solar calendar: 1326–1327
- Tibetan calendar: ཆུ་མོ་ཕག་ལོ་ (female Water-Boar); 910 or 529 or −243 — to — ཤིང་ཕོ་བྱི་བ་ལོ་ (male Wood-Rat); 911 or 530 or −242

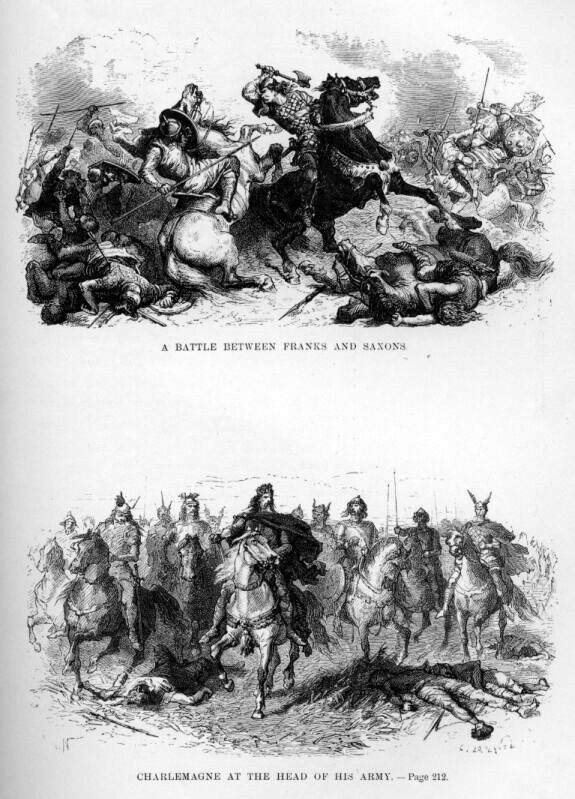
King Charlemagne and the Saxons (1869)

Year 784 (DCCLXXXIV) was a leap year starting on Thursday of the Julian calendar, the 784th year of the Common Era (CE) and Anno Domini (AD) designations, the 784th year of the 1st millennium, the 84th year of the 8th century, and the 5th year of the 780s decade. The denomination 784 for this year has been used since the early medieval period, when the Anno Domini calendar era became the prevalent method in Europe for naming years.

== Events ==
=== By place ===
==== Europe ====
- Saxon Wars: King Charlemagne begins a campaign in northern Saxony. He ravages Eastphalian territory as far as the Elbe River, while his son, Charles the Younger, defeats a Saxon force in the Lippe Valley. Bad weather hinders Charlemagne's winter campaign in southern Saxony.
- Winter – Charlemagne returns to Eresburg and builds a church, probably on the site of the Irminsul (a pagan religious site). Frankish forces based at Eresburg attack rebel Saxon settlements, and take control of the roads. Charlemagne himself takes part in some of these raids.

==== Arabian Empire ====
- Abd al-Rahman I, Muslim emir of Córdoba (Al-Andalus), begins the construction of the Prayer Hall of the Great Mosque of Córdoba. He uses the mosque (originally called Aljama Mosque) as an adjunct to his palace, and names it in honour of his wife.
- In Abbasid Caliphate,Bashshar ibn Burd,born-blind Arabian poet,famous for his sharp wit and public challenges to religious dogma.He frequently mocked the religious elite.During the heavy anti-heresy inquisitions (Zandaqa campaigns) under the Abbasid Caliph Al-Mahdi,he was arrested for heresy, severely scourged (flogged) to death, and his body was dumped into a marsh between Baghdad and Basra.

==== Asia ====
- The Japanese begin a war against the Ainu, in the north, on the main island of Honshu. Emperor Kanmu wishes to be free from the influence of the Buddhist monasteries around Nara (then called Heijō), and moves the capital to Nagaoka, ending the Nara period.
- Nagaoka-kyō becomes the Japanese imperial capital.

==== Central America ====
- February 4 – Itzamnaaj K'awiil, brother of Bat K'awiil (who reigned between 780 and 784) and the son of K'ahk' Ukalaw Chan Chaak (who ruled 755 to 780) becomes the new ruler of the Mayan city state of Naranjo in Guatemala and reigns until his death in 810.

=== By topic ===
==== Religion ====
- August 30 – Paul IV abdicates as patriarch of Constantinople.
- December 25 – Tarasios is elected patriarch of Constantinople.

== Births ==
- Ibn Sa'd al-Baghdadi, Muslim historian (d. 845)
- Li Jue, chancellor of the Tang Dynasty (approximate date)
- Theodrada, Frankish princess and abbess, daughter of Charlemagne (approximate date)

== Deaths ==
- May 4 – Arbeo, bishop of Freising
- July 16 – Fulrad, Frankish abbot (b. 710)
- August 21 – Alberic, archbishop of Utrecht
- Autpert Ambrose, Frankish abbot
- Bashshar ibn Burd, Arabian poet
- Isa ibn Musa, Muslim governor (or 783)
- Paul IV, patriarch of Constantinople
- Vergilius, bishop of Salzburg
