= 845 =

Calendar year

845 in various calendars
- Gregorian calendar: 845; DCCCXLV
- Ab urbe condita: 1598
- Armenian calendar: 294; ԹՎ ՄՂԴ
- Assyrian calendar: 5595
- Balinese saka calendar: 766–767
- Bengali calendar: 251–252
- Berber calendar: 1795
- Buddhist calendar: 1389
- Burmese calendar: 207
- Byzantine calendar: 6353–6354
- Chinese calendar: 甲子年 (Wood Rat); 3542 or 3335 — to — 乙丑年 (Wood Ox); 3543 or 3336
- Coptic calendar: 561–562
- Discordian calendar: 2011
- Ethiopian calendar: 837–838
- Hebrew calendar: 4605–4606
- Hindu calendars
- Vikram Samvat: 901–902
- Shaka Samvat: 766–767
- Kali Yuga: 3945–3946
- Holocene calendar: 10845
- Iranian calendar: 223–224
- Islamic calendar: 230–231
- Japanese calendar: Jōwa 12 (承和１２年)
- Javanese calendar: 742–743
- Julian calendar: 845; DCCCXLV
- Korean calendar: 3178
- Minguo calendar: 1067 before ROC 民前1067年
- Nanakshahi calendar: −623
- Seleucid era: 1156/1157 AG
- Thai solar calendar: 1387–1388
- Tibetan calendar: ཤིང་ཕོ་བྱི་བ་ལོ་ (male Wood-Rat); 971 or 590 or −182 — to — ཤིང་མོ་གླང་ལོ་ (female Wood-Ox); 972 or 591 or −181

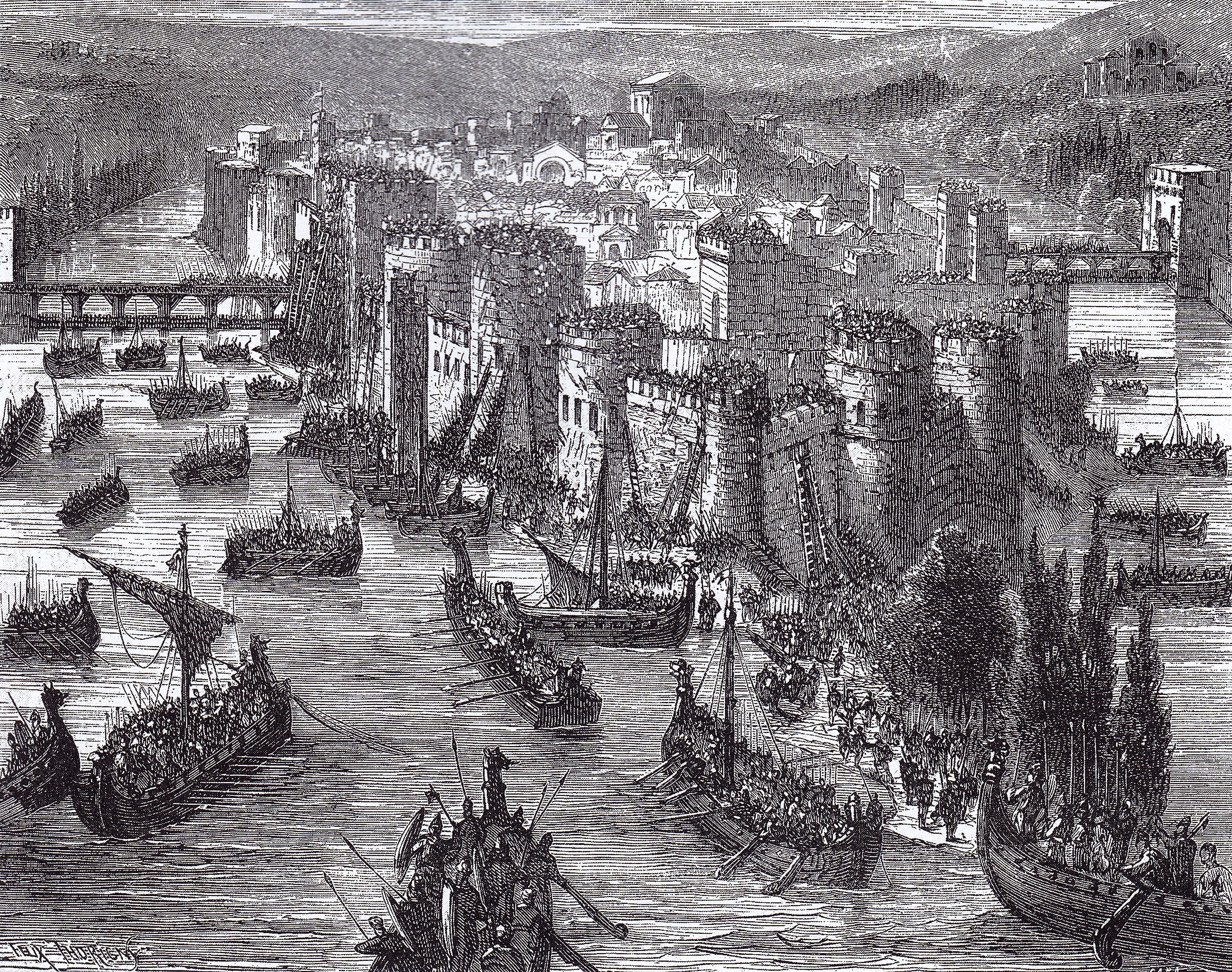
Viking longships besieging Paris (845)

Year 845 (DCCCXLV) was a common year starting on Thursday of the Julian calendar.

== Events ==
=== By place ===
==== Byzantine Empire ====
- Byzantine–Arab War: A prisoner exchange occurs between the Byzantine Empire and the Abbasid Caliphate, at the River Lamos in Cilicia (modern Turkey). The exchanges last for 10 days, and the Byzantines recover 4,600 prisoners.

==== Europe ====
- March 28 or 29 (Easter) – Siege of Paris: Viking forces under the Norse chieftain Ragnar Lodbrok enter the River Seine, with a fleet of 120 longships (5,000 men). They pass through the city of Rouen and plunder the countryside. King Charles the Bald assembles an army and sends it to protect Paris, the capital of the West Frankish Kingdom. Ragnar routs the enemy forces, and hangs 111 of their prisoners in honour of Odin. Charles — to keep them from plundering his kingdom — pays a large tribute of 7,000 livres (pounds) of silver or gold, in exchange for their leaving. The Vikings also sack the cities of Hamburg and Melun.
- November 22 – Battle of Ballon: Frankish forces (3,000 men) led by Charles the Bald are defeated by Nominoe, count of Vannes, near Redon, Ille-et-Vilaine. After the battle, Brittany becomes a regnum 'kingdom' within the Frankish Empire.
- Viking forces destroy Hamburg.

==== Asia ====
- Great Anti-Buddhist Persecution: Emperor Wu Zong begins the persecution of Buddhists and other foreign religions in China, such as Zoroastrianism, Nestorian Christianity and Manichaeism. More than 4,600 monasteries, 40,000 temples and numerous shrines are destroyed. More than 260,000 Buddhist monks and nuns are forced to return to secular life.
- March 6 – 42 captured Byzantine officials from Amorium are executed at Samarra, then the capital of the Abbasid Caliphate, after they repeatedly refuse attempts to convert them to Islam.

=== By topic ===
==== Religion ====
- John Scotus Eriugena, Irish theologian, travels to France and takes over the Palatine Academy in Paris, at the invitation of Charles the Bald (approximate date).

== Births ==
- August 1 – Sugawara no Michizane, Japanese politician (d. 903)
- Árpád, Grand Prince of the Hungarians (approximate date)
- Berengar I, king of Italy (approximate date)
- Charles of Provence, Frankish king (d. 863)
- Liutgard of Saxony, Frankish queen (approximate date)
- Minamoto no Yoshiari, Japanese official (d. 897)
- Ricfried, Frankish nobleman (d. 950)
- Richilde of Provence, Frankish empress (approximate date)

== Deaths ==
- February 22 – Wang, empress and concubine of Mu Zong
- Abdallah ibn Tahir, Muslim governor (or 844)
- Abu Tammam, Muslim poet (b. 788)
- Bridei VII, king of the Picts
- Dionysius I, Syrian patriarch
- Ecgred, bishop of Lindisfarne
- Eginhard, bishop of Utrecht
- Guerin, Frankish nobleman (or 856)
- Ibn Sa'd al-Baghdadi, Muslim historian (b. 784)
- Mislav, duke of Croatia (approximate date)
- Sahl ibn Bishr, Muslim astrologer (approximate date)
- Theophanes the Branded, Byzantine monk (b. 775)
- Turgesius, Viking chieftain (approximate date)

== Sources ==
- Huart, Cl. (1986). "Lamas-Ṣū". In Bosworth, C. E.; van Donzel, E.; Lewis, B. & Pellat, Ch. (eds.). The Encyclopaedia of Islam, Second Edition. Volume V: Khe–Mahi. Leiden: E. J. Brill. p. 647. ISBN 978-90-04-07819-2.
- Jones, Gwyn (2001). A History of the Vikings. Oxford University. ISBN 978-0-19-280134-0.
- Sawyer, PH (2001). Illustrated History of the Vikings. Oxford University. ISBN 978-0-19-285434-6.
- Toynbee, Arnold (1973). Constantine Porphyrogenitus and His World. London and New York: Oxford University Press. ISBN 0-19-215253-X.
