= Council of Paderborn =

Important piece in Christianization of Saxons

The Council of Paderborn of 785 was an important piece in the Christianization of the Saxons and aided in establishing a short lived peace by force between the Saxons and Franks. It resolved to make punishable by law all sorts of idolatry, the belief in the existence of witchcraft, causing the deaths of others through witch-hunting, and more.

== Background ==
After achieving peace in Saxony in 780, Charlemagne returned in 782 and enforced a new code of law, the opposition to which began the middle phase of the Saxon Wars. After a hard fought struggle with Widukind, a Saxon leader, Charlemagne won in 785. Widukind and his son accepted baptism and converted to Christianity that year, being a key step in Charlemagne's effort to conquer and convert the Saxons. Widukind's capitulation and conversion, Capitulatio de partibus Saxoniae, and the Council of Paderborn, all in 785, created a short peace between the Saxons and Franks until the start of the final phase in the early 790s.

== Resolutions ==
Charlemagne especially repressed the Saxons, and the Council of Paderborn was no different. It punished all sorts of idolatry, denied the existence of witchcraft and the efficacy of magic, ordered the death penalty for self-appointed witch-hunters who had caused the death of persons accused of witchcraft, condemned sorcerers to be servants to the church, commanded Saxons to have infants baptized the first year. The law is particularly noted for the way it also condemned to death "anyone who, blinded by the Devil, heathenwise should believe a person to be a witch and maneater, and should on that account have burned him or eaten his flesh, or given it to others to eat." It is part of the goal of rejecting the existence of witches and that burning them was considered a pagan custom. To enforce the law and prosecute offenders, authorities sometimes used torture, which is an act sanctioned by the Roman civil law. A source stated that the Council of Paderborn was aimed at the Saxons and those people living in territories that he recently conquered, particularly those who resisted conversion to Christianity.
