= 702 =

Calendar year

702 in various calendars
Gregorian calendar	702; DCCII
Ab urbe condita	1455
Armenian calendar	151; ԹՎ ՃԾԱ
Assyrian calendar	5452
Balinese saka calendar	623–624
Bengali calendar	108–109
Berber calendar	1652
Buddhist calendar	1246
Burmese calendar	64
Byzantine calendar	6210–6211
Chinese calendar	辛丑年 (Metal Ox); 3399 or 3192 — to — 壬寅年 (Water Tiger); 3400 or 3193
Coptic calendar	418–419
Discordian calendar	1868
Ethiopian calendar	694–695
Hebrew calendar	4462–4463
- Hindu calendars
Vikram Samvat	758–759
Shaka Samvat	623–624
Kali Yuga	3802–3803
Holocene calendar	10702
Iranian calendar	80–81
Islamic calendar	82–83
Japanese calendar	Taihō 2 (大宝２年)
Javanese calendar	594–595
Julian calendar	702; DCCII
Korean calendar	3035
Minguo calendar	1210 before ROC 民前1210年
Nanakshahi calendar	−766
Seleucid era	1013/1014 AG
Thai solar calendar	1244–1245
Tibetan calendar	ལྕགས་མོ་གླང་ལོ་ (female Iron-Ox); 828 or 447 or −325 — to — ཆུ་ཕོ་སྟག་ལོ་ (male Water-Tiger); 829 or 448 or −324

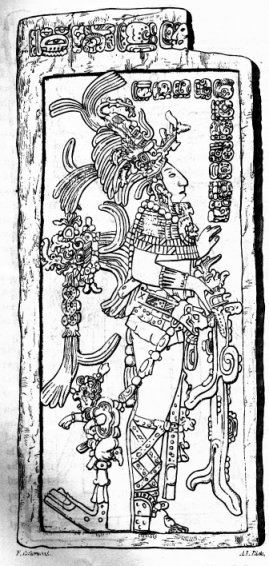
Kʼinich Kan Bahlam II (635–702)

Year 702 (DCCII) was a common year starting on Sunday of the Julian calendar, the 702nd year of the Common Era (CE) and Anno Domini (AD) designations, the 702nd year of the 1st millennium, the 2nd year of the 8th century, and the 3rd year of the 700s decade. The denomination 702 for this year has been used since the early medieval period, when the Anno Domini calendar era became the prevalent method in Europe for naming years.

== Events ==
=== By place ===
==== Europe ====
- Hedan II, duke of Thuringia, completes the circular Marienkirche, in Fortress Marienberg near Würzburg (Germany).

==== Arabian Empire ====
- Arab conquest of Armenia: Large-scale Armenian rebellion against Muslim rule breaks out, with Byzantine support.
- Muslim-Arabs under Musa ibn Nusayr conquer Tangier and Sous, taking control of all Morocco (approximate date).
- Ethiopian (Axumite) raiders occupy the port of Jeddah (modern Saudi Arabia).

==== Mesoamerica ====
- February 20 – Kʼinich Kan Bahlam II, ruler (ajaw) of Palenque, dies after an 18-year reign. He is succeeded by his brother Kʼinich Kʼan Joy Chitam II.

=== By topic ===
==== Religion ====
- Berhtwald, archbishop of Canterbury, calls the Council of Austerfield to decide the rights of Wilfrid, some-time bishop of York. He is offered Ripon Abbey if he will relinquish his claims as bishop. Wilfrid rejects this offer and appeals to Rome.

== Births ==
- Ja'far al-Sadiq, sixth Shī‘ah Imām and Muslim scholar (d. 765)
- Ōnakatomi no Kiyomaro, Japanese nobleman (d. 788)

== Deaths ==
- Al-Muhallab ibn Abi Sufra, Arab general and governor of Basra
- Berlinda of Meerbeke, Frankish nun and saint (approximate date)
- Chen Zi'ang, Chinese poet and official of the Tang dynasty (b. 661)
- Kʼinich Kan Bahlam II, ruler of Palenque (b. 635)
- Liutpert, king of the Lombards
- Muiredach Muillethan, king of Connacht (Ireland)
- Ōku, Japanese princess (b. 661)
