= 823 =

Calendar year

823 in various calendars
Gregorian calendar	823; DCCCXXIII
Ab urbe condita	1576
Armenian calendar	272; ԹՎ ՄՀԲ
Assyrian calendar	5573
Balinese saka calendar	744–745
Bengali calendar	229–230
Berber calendar	1773
Buddhist calendar	1367
Burmese calendar	185
Byzantine calendar	6331–6332
Chinese calendar	壬寅年 (Water Tiger); 3520 or 3313 — to — 癸卯年 (Water Rabbit); 3521 or 3314
Coptic calendar	539–540
Discordian calendar	1989
Ethiopian calendar	815–816
Hebrew calendar	4583–4584
- Hindu calendars
Vikram Samvat	879–880
Shaka Samvat	744–745
Kali Yuga	3923–3924
Holocene calendar	10823
Iranian calendar	201–202
Islamic calendar	207–208
Japanese calendar	Kōnin 14 (弘仁１４年)
Javanese calendar	719–720
Julian calendar	823; DCCCXXIII
Korean calendar	3156
Minguo calendar	1089 before ROC 民前1089年
Nanakshahi calendar	−645
Seleucid era	1134/1135 AG
Thai solar calendar	1365–1366
Tibetan calendar	阳水虎年 (male Water-Tiger); 949 or 568 or −204 — to — 阴水兔年 (female Water-Rabbit); 950 or 569 or −203

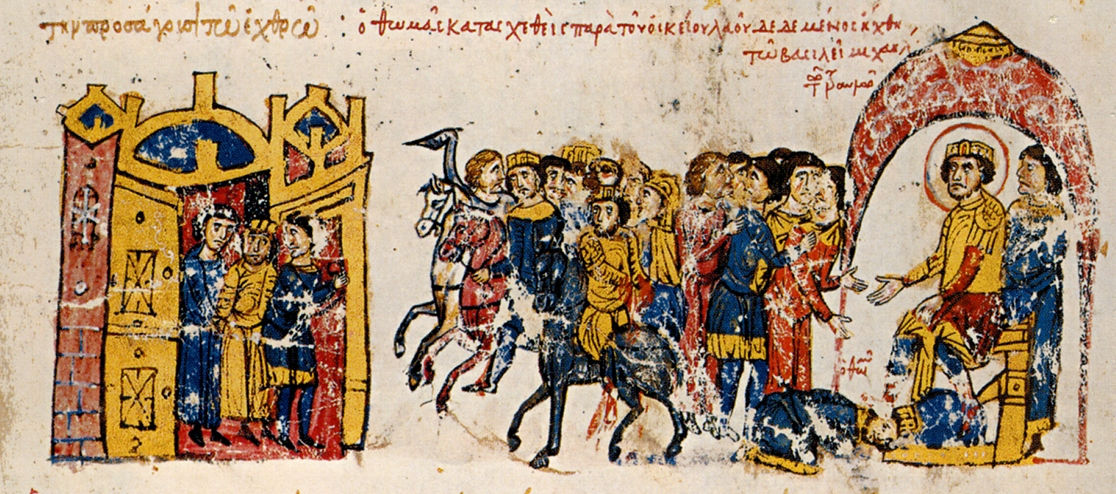
Thomas the Slav surrenders to Michael II

Year 823 (DCCCXXIII) was a common year starting on Thursday of the Julian calendar.

== Events ==
=== By place ===
==== Byzantine Empire ====
- Emperor Michael II defeats the rebel forces under Thomas the Slav in Thrace. He and his supporters are forced to seek refuge in Arkadiopolis (modern Turkey). After five months of blockade, Thomas surrenders and is delivered to Michael, seated on a donkey and bound in chains. He pleads for clemency and prostrates before Michael, but is executed.

==== Europe ====
- April 5 – Lothair I, eldest son of Emperor Louis I, is crowned co-emperor again by Pope Paschal I at Rome (initiating the papal practice of handing the imperial sword over, as a symbol of temporal power in the Holy Roman Empire).

==== Britain ====
- King Ceolwulf I of Mercia is deposed by Beornwulf, who takes the throne of Mercia. During his rule he rebuilds the Abbey of St. Peter, and presides over two synods at Clofesho.

==== Japan ====
- May 30 – Emperor Saga abdicates the throne, after a 10-year reign. He is succeeded by his brother Junna, as the 53rd emperor of Japan.

== Births ==
- June 13 – Charles the Bald, king of the Franks (d. 877)
- Ermentrude of Orléans, queen of the Franks (d. 869)
- Muhammad I, Muslim emir of Córdoba (d. 886)
- Pepin II (the Younger), king of Aquitaine

== Deaths ==
- Adelochus, archbishop of Strasbourg (b. 786)
- Boniface I, margrave of Tuscany
- Ceolwulf I, king of Mercia (approximate date)
- Gondulphus, bishop of Metz
- Han Hong, general of the Tang Dynasty b. 765)
- Ljudevit, duke of the Slavs in Lower Pannonia
- Thekla, Byzantine empress (approximate date)
- Thomas the Slav, Byzantine general and usurper
- Timothy I, Syrian patriarch
- Wulfheard, bishop of Hereford (approximate date)
