= Alberic of Utrecht =

Alberic of Utrecht may refer to:

- Alberic I of Utrecht, bishop (r. 777–784), saint
- Alberic II of Utrecht, bishop (r. 835–844)
