= 710 =

Calendar year

710 in various calendars
- Gregorian calendar: 710; DCCX
- Ab urbe condita: 1463
- Armenian calendar: 159; ԹՎ ՃԾԹ
- Assyrian calendar: 5460
- Balinese saka calendar: 631–632
- Bengali calendar: 116–117
- Berber calendar: 1660
- Buddhist calendar: 1254
- Burmese calendar: 72
- Byzantine calendar: 6218–6219
- Chinese calendar: 己酉年 (Earth Rooster); 3407 or 3200 — to — 庚戌年 (Metal Dog); 3408 or 3201
- Coptic calendar: 426–427
- Discordian calendar: 1876
- Ethiopian calendar: 702–703
- Hebrew calendar: 4470–4471
- Hindu calendars
- Vikram Samvat: 766–767
- Shaka Samvat: 631–632
- Kali Yuga: 3810–3811
- Holocene calendar: 10710
- Iranian calendar: 88–89
- Islamic calendar: 91–92
- Japanese calendar: Wadō 3 (和銅３年)
- Javanese calendar: 603–604
- Julian calendar: 710; DCCX
- Korean calendar: 3043
- Minguo calendar: 1202 before ROC 民前1202年
- Nanakshahi calendar: −758
- Seleucid era: 1021/1022 AG
- Thai solar calendar: 1252–1253
- Tibetan calendar: ས་མོ་བྱ་ལོ་ (female Earth-Bird); 836 or 455 or −317 — to — ལྕགས་ཕོ་ཁྱི་ལོ་ (male Iron-Dog); 837 or 456 or −316

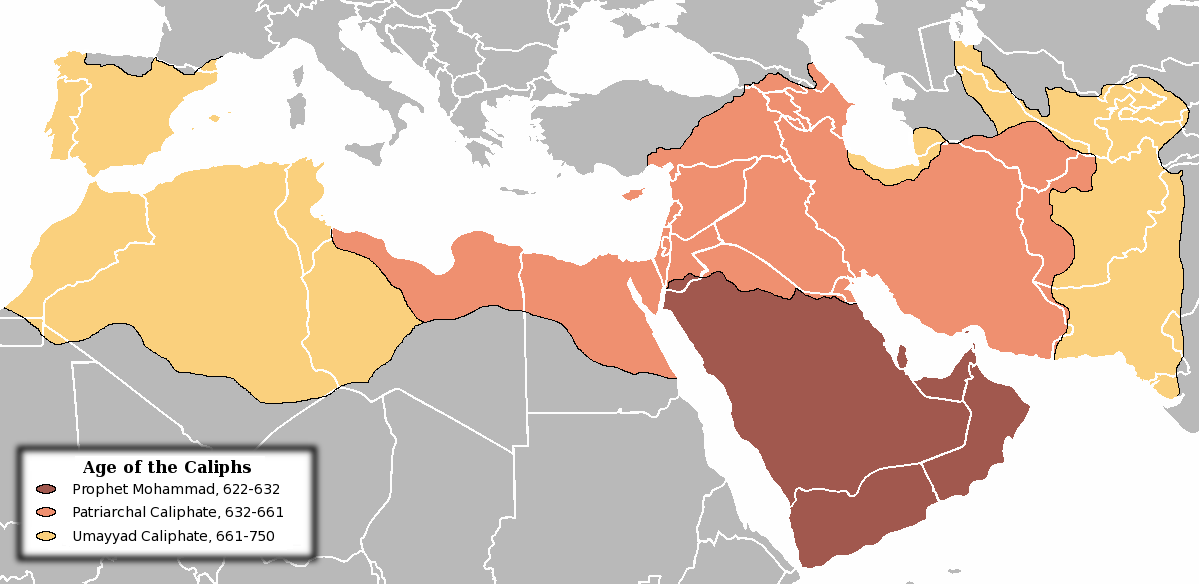
The Arabs begin a raiding expedition against the Visigothic Kingdom in Spain (8th century)

Year 710 (DCCX) was a common year starting on Wednesday of the Julian calendar. The denomination 710 for this year has been used since the early medieval period, when the Anno Domini calendar era became the prevalent method in Europe for naming years.

== Events ==
=== By place ===
==== Byzantine Empire ====
- The Byzantine outpost of Cherson (Crimea) rebels (with Khazar assistance) against Emperor Justinian II. He sends a fleet under the patrikios Stephen, which retakes the city and restores Byzantine control. The fleet, however, is struck by a storm on its way back and loses many ships, while the Chersonites, again with the aid of the Khazars, rebel anew.
- The Byzantine general Leo (future emperor Leo III) recovers the Abkhazia (Caucasus) for the Byzantine Empire, from the Arabs.

==== Europe ====
- Roderick becomes king of the Visigoths, but the Visigothic nobles in Septimania rebel, and proclaim the previous ruler's son Akhila king. The Visigothic Kingdom is divided into two sub-kingdoms, suffering the first Muslim raid expedition against the southern Iberian Peninsula.
- An Arab army is invited into Ceuta by its governor, Julian, who is an opponent of Roderick. He encourages them to invade the Iberian Peninsula. Tariq ibn Ziyad is appointed governor of Tangier (Morocco), and establishes a Moorish garrison of 1,700 men.
- Lupus I, duke of Gascony, is assassinated in his attempt to seize Limoges (France). Eudes becomes ruler over both Gascony and Aquitaine.
- The Madara Rider, an early medieval rock relief, is carved on the Madara Plateau east of Shumen in Bulgaria (approximate date).

==== Britain ====
- Kings Ine of Wessex and Nothhelm of Sussex fight against King Geraint of Dumnonia, who dies in battle. Ine's advance brings him control of what is now Devon; he establishes a fortress at Taunton.
- Beorhtfrith fights against the Picts between Haefe and Caere (assumed to be between the rivers Avon and Carron, which flow into the Firth of Forth in Scotland).

==== Africa ====
- Salih I ibn Mansur founds the Muslim Kingdom of Nekor (Morocco). He converts the local Berber tribes to Islam.

==== Asia ====
- April 5 – Emperor Zhong Zong of the Tang dynasty has his chief ministers of court, sons-in-law, and high-ranking military officers engage (during the Cold Food Festival) in the festive game of tug of war, within a palace of Chang'an.
- July 3 – Zhong Zong is assassinated, allegedly poisoned by Empress Wei, who fails to install her daughter Li Guo'er as heir to the throne. Princess Taiping and her nephew Li Longji launch a coup, and restore Rui Zong as emperor.
- The Asuka period, the second and last part of the Yamato period, ends, and the Nara period begins; Heijō-kyō (Nara) becomes the capital of Japan.

=== By topic ===
==== Religion ====
- October 5 – Pope Constantine departs for a year-long visit to Constantinople. He will be the last pontiff to visit the capital for more than a thousand years.
- The first (wooden) Al-Aqsa Mosque is finished.

== Births ==
- Fulrad, Frankish abbot (d. 784)
- Hnabi, duke of the Alemanni (approximate date)
- Leoba, Anglo-Saxon nun (approximate date)
- Lullus, archbishop of Mainz (approximate date)
- Walpurga, Anglo-Saxon missionary (d. 779)

== Deaths ==
- January 9 – Adrian of Canterbury, abbot and scholar
- March 27 – Rupert, bishop of Salzburg
- June 30 – Erentrude, Frankish abbess
- July 3 – Zhong Zong, emperor of the Tang dynasty (b. 656)
- July 21
  - Li Guo'er, princess of the Tang dynasty
  - Shangguan Wan'er, Chinese poet (b. 664)
  - Empress Wei, empress of the Tang dynasty
- September 10 – Li Chongfu, imperial prince of the Chinese Tang dynasty (b. c. 680)
- Al-Akhtal, Arab poet
- Arikesari Maravarman, king of the Pandyan Empire (India)
- Bahram VII, son of Yazdegerd III
- Congal Cennmagair, High King of Ireland
- Emebert, bishop of Cambrai
- Geraint, king of Dumnonia (England)
- Giles, Frankish abbot (approximate date)
- Kakinomoto no Hitomaro, Japanese poet
- Lupus I, duke of Gascony
- Wilfred, Anglo-Saxon bishop (or 709)
- Wittiza, king of the Visigoths (approximate date)
