= Al-Ḥajjāj ibn Yūsuf ibn Maṭar =

Medieval Arab mathematician

Al-Ḥajjāj ibn Yūsuf ibn Maṭar (786–833 CE) was an Arab mathematician and translator.

== Biography ==
Almost nothing is known about his life, except that he was active in Baghdad, then the capital of the ʿAbbāsid Empire.

He was the first author who translated Euclid's Elements from Greek into Arabic. His first translation was made for Yaḥyā ibn Khālid, the Vizier of Caliph Hārūn al-Rashīd. He made a second, improved, more concise translation for the Caliph al-Maʾmūn (813–833). Around 829, he translated Ptolemy's Almagest, which at that time had also been translated by Hunayn Ibn Ishaq and Sahl al-Ṭabarī.

At the beginning of the 12th century CE, Adelard of Bath translated al-Ḥajjāj's version of Euclid's Elements into Latin.
