= 709 =

Calendar year

709 in various calendars
| Gregorian calendar | 709; DCCIX |
| Ab urbe condita | 1462 |
| Armenian calendar | 158; ԹՎ ՃԾԸ |
| Assyrian calendar | 5459 |
| Balinese saka calendar | 630–631 |
| Bengali calendar | 115–116 |
| Berber calendar | 1659 |
| Buddhist calendar | 1253 |
| Burmese calendar | 71 |
| Byzantine calendar | 6217–6218 |
| Chinese calendar | 戊申年 (Earth Monkey); 3406 or 3199 — to — 己酉年 (Earth Rooster); 3407 or 3200 |
| Coptic calendar | 425–426 |
| Discordian calendar | 1875 |
| Ethiopian calendar | 701–702 |
| Hebrew calendar | 4469–4470 |
- Hindu calendars
| Vikram Samvat | 765–766 |
| Shaka Samvat | 630–631 |
| Kali Yuga | 3809–3810 |
| Holocene calendar | 10709 |
| Iranian calendar | 87–88 |
| Islamic calendar | 90–91 |
| Japanese calendar | Wadō 2 (和銅２年) |
| Javanese calendar | 602–603 |
| Julian calendar | 709; DCCIX |
| Korean calendar | 3042 |
| Minguo calendar | 1203 before ROC 民前1203年 |
| Nanakshahi calendar | −759 |
| Seleucid era | 1020/1021 AG |
| Thai solar calendar | 1251–1252 |
| Tibetan calendar | ས་ཕོ་སྤྲེ་ལོ་ (male Earth-Monkey); 835 or 454 or −318 — to — ས་མོ་བྱ་ལོ་ (female Earth-Bird); 836 or 455 or −317 |

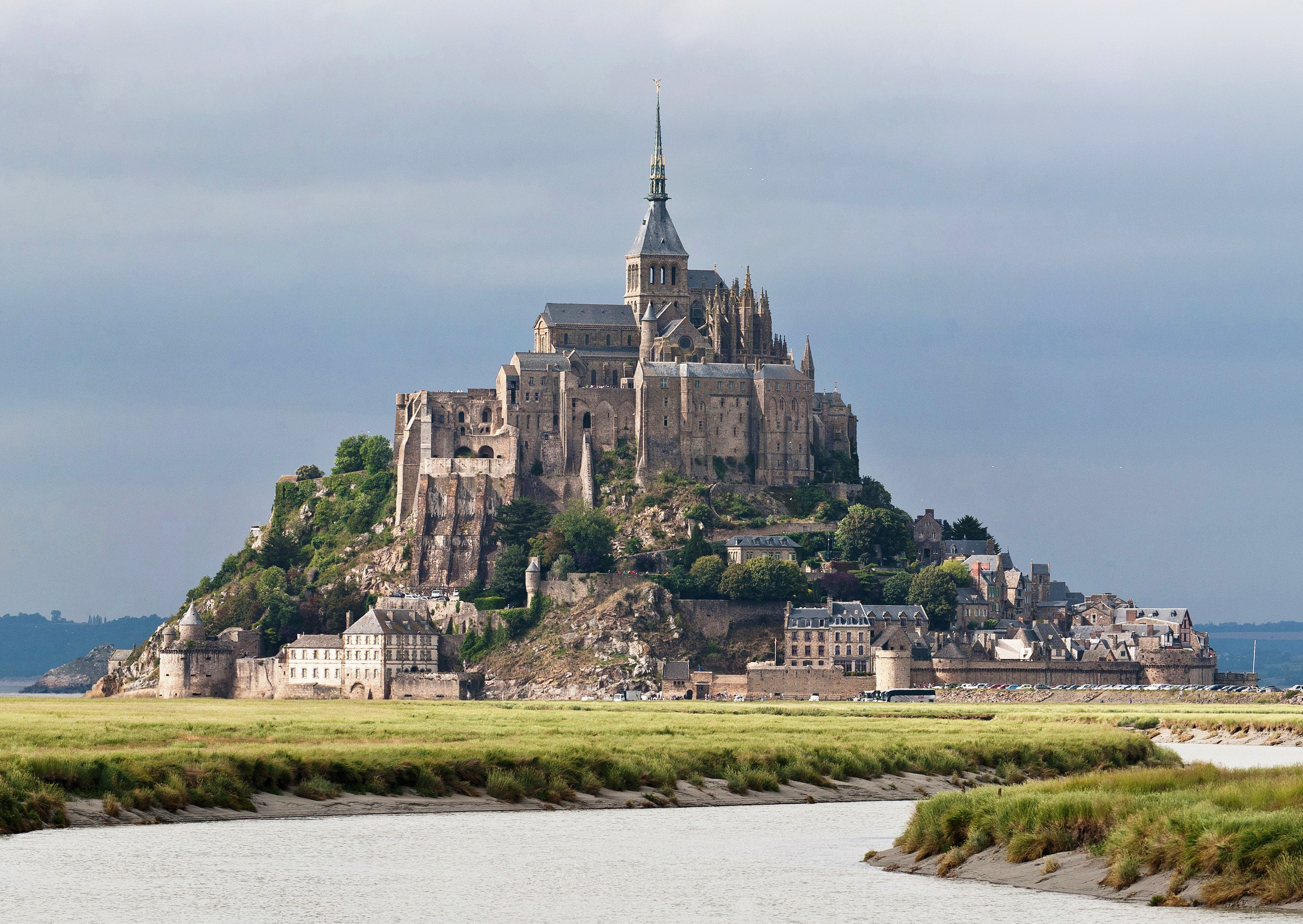
Mont Saint-Michel (Normandy)

Year 709 (DCCIX) was a common year starting on Tuesday of the Julian calendar. The denomination 709 for this year has been used since the early medieval period, when the Anno Domini calendar era became the prevalent method in Europe for naming years.

== Events ==
=== By place ===
==== Byzantine Empire ====
- June – Emperor Justinian II sends a punitive expedition to Italy under the patrikios Theodore, to intervene in the dispute between Pope Constantine I and Archbishop Felix of Ravenna, who claims to be independent of the pope's authority. Theodore captures Ravenna, and arrests Felix and other Italian leaders. He deports them to Constantinople, from whence they are exiled to Cherson (Crimea).

==== Britain ====
- Ceolred becomes king of Mercia, after his cousin Coenred abdicates the throne. Dynastic rivalries lead to the banishment of his second cousin, prince Æthelbald, who flees to the East Anglian controlled Crowland Fens.
- Kings Swæfred and Sigeheard of Essex share power with Offa. He abdicates the throne in order to become a monk in Rome, along with Coenred. Saelred rules jointly with Swæfberht the sub-kingdom of Middlesex.

==== Arabian Empire ====
- Arab–Byzantine War: An Umayyad army under Maslamah ibn Abd al-Malik raids Isauria (modern Turkey). He is appointed military governor of Armenia and Azerbaijan, succeeding his uncle Muhammad ibn Marwan.
- After two years of failed efforts, Qutayba ibn Muslim captures Bukhara (Uzbekistan) for the Umayyad Caliphate. The Hephthalite princes of Tokharistan rebel against the Arabs, but are swiftly subdued by Qutayba.

=== By topic ===
==== Architecture, real estate ====
- Mont Saint-Michel, built by Aubert, bishop of Avranches, has its beginnings in an oratory on Mont Tombe, on the coast of Normandy (approximate date).

==== Environmental change ====
- A storm separates the Channel Islands of Jethou and Herm.

== Births ==
- November 18 – Kōnin, emperor of Japan (d. 782)
- Du Hongjian, chancellor of the Tang Dynasty (d. 769)
- Liu Zhangqing, Chinese poet (d. 785)
- Mazu Daoyi, Chinese Zen Buddhist monk (d. 788)
- Yan Zhenqing, Chinese calligrapher (d. 785)
- Yaxun B'alam IV, king of Yaxchilan (Mexico) (d. 768)
- Zhang Xun, general of the Tang Dynasty (d. 757)

== Deaths ==
- May 25 – Aldhelm, bishop of Sherborne
- Æthelred, king of Mercia (approximate date)
- Bertin, Frankish abbot (approximate date)
- Gotfrid, duke of Alemannia (approximate date)
- Swæfred, king of Essex (approximate date)
- Wilfrid, Anglo-Saxon bishop (or 710)
