= Mauregatus =

King of Asturias from 783 to 789

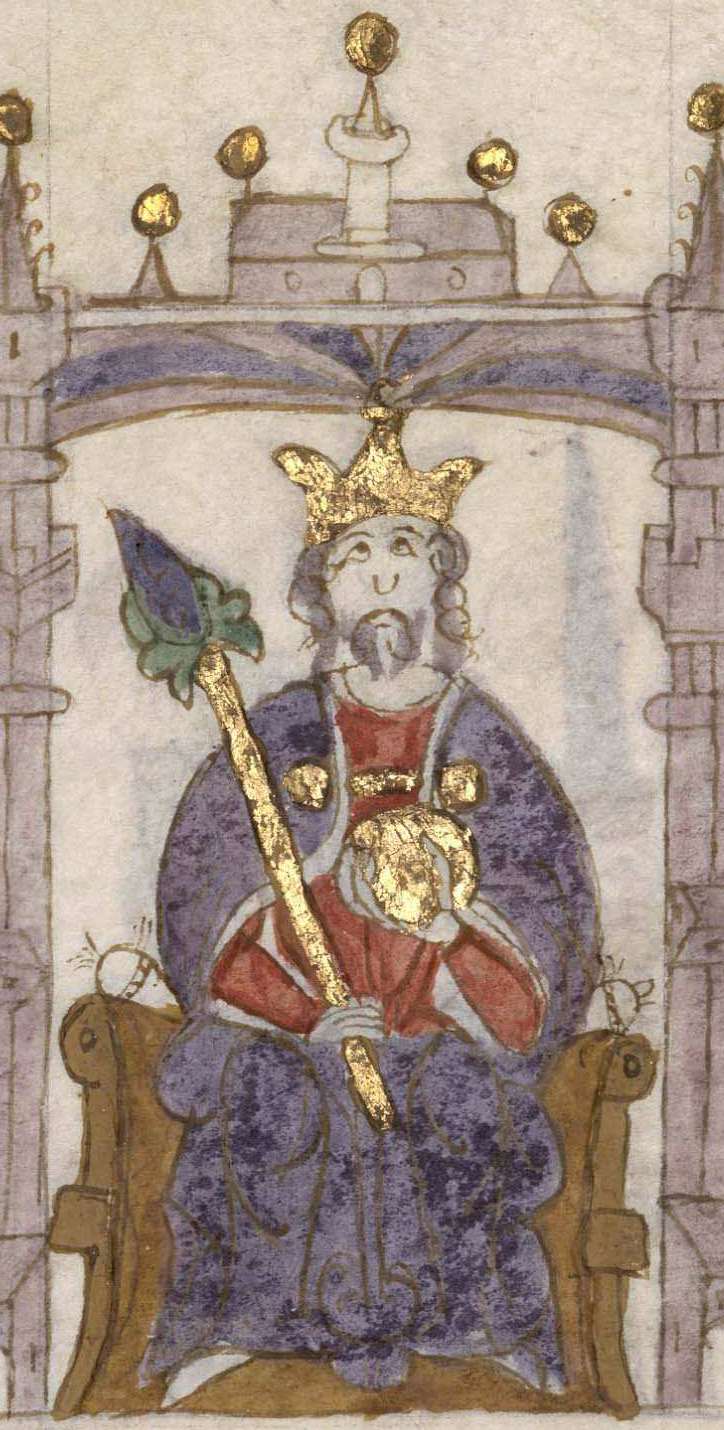
- Depiction in the Castilian manuscript Compendium of Chronicles of Kings, c. 1312–1325

King of Asturias
- Reign: 783–789
- Coronation: 783
- Predecessor: Alfonso II
- Successor: Bermudo I
- Born: Asturias
- Died: 789; Pravia, Asturias
- Burial: Church of San Juan Apóstol y Evangelista, Santianes de Pravia
- Spouse: Creusa
- Issue: Hermenegildo
- Dynasty: Astur-Leonese dynasty
- Father: Alfonso I of Asturias
- Mother: Sisalda
- Religion: Chalcedonian Christianity

Mauregatus the Usurper (Spanish: Mauregato) was the king of Asturias from 783 to 788 or 789. He was an illegitimate son of Alfonso I, supposedly by a Moorish serf. He usurped the throne on the death of Silo, the husband of his half sister Adosinda, earning himself the nickname of the Usurper. The nobility had elected Alfonso II at Adosinda's insistence, but Mauregatus assembled a large army of supporters and forced Alfonso into exile in Álava.

According to folklore, Mauregatus and Moorish rulers agreed to the apocryphal "Tribute of the 100 Maidens," which gifted the Moors 100 Asturian virgins annually as repayment for their assistance in Mauregatus' rise to the throne. This arrangement supposedly ended after Ramiro I's defeat of the Moors at the legendary Battle of Clavijo.

After six years in power, he died of natural causes in 789 and was buried in the Church of San Juan Apóstol y Evangelista in Pravia. Following his death, Bermudo I was chosen as his successor.

Preceded by Alfonso II	King of Asturias; 783–788/789	Succeeded by Bermudo I
