= Massacre of Verden =

782 killing of Saxons by Charlemagne

- Date: October 782; 1243 years ago
- Location: Lower Saxony
- Type: Massacre
- Cause: Unknown
- Perpetrator: Franks
- Deaths: 4,500
- Displaced: 2,000

The Massacre of Verden was an event during the Saxon Wars where the Frankish king Charlemagne ordered the death of 4,500 Saxons in October 782. Charlemagne claimed suzerainty over Saxony and in 772 destroyed the Irminsul, an important object in Saxon paganism, during his intermittent thirty-year campaign to Christianize the Saxons. The massacre occurred in Verden in what is now Lower Saxony, Germany. The event is attested in contemporary Frankish sources, including the Royal Frankish Annals.

Beginning in the 870s, some scholars have attempted to exonerate Charlemagne of the massacre by way of a proposed manuscript error but these attempts have since been generally rejected. While the figure of 4,500 victims has generally been accepted, some scholars regard it as an exaggeration.

== Sources ==
An entry for the year 782 in the first version of the Royal Frankish Annals (Annales Regni Francorum) records a Saxon rebellion, followed by a Saxon victory in the battle of Süntel before Charlemagne arrived and put down the rebellion. Charlemagne ordered the execution of 4,500 Saxons near the confluence of the Aller and the Weser, in what is now Verden. Regarding the massacre, the entry reads:

When he heard this, the Lord King Charles rushed to the place with all the Franks that he could gather on short notice and advanced to where the Aller flows into the Weser. Then all the Saxons came together again, submitted to the authority of the Lord King, and surrendered the evildoers who were chiefly responsible for this revolt to be put to death—four thousand and five hundred of them. This sentence was carried out. Widukind was not among them since he had fled to Nordmannia [Denmark]. When he had finished this business, the Lord King returned to Francia.

The Annales qui dicuntur Einhardi (Annals of Einhard), which are a revised version of the Royal Frankish Annals and not a completely independent source, give a different account of the battle of the Süntel, recording that Charlemagne lost two envoys, four counts, and around twenty nobles in a Frankish defeat. The reviser agrees about the punishment meted out on the Saxon rebels, and adds some details, such as that the Saxons blamed Widukind, that the number 4,500 was a minimum and that the executions took place in a single day:

When the king heard of this disaster he decided not to delay, but made haste to gather an army, and marched into Saxony. There he called to his presence the chiefs of the Saxons, and inquired who had induced the people to rebel. They all declared that Widukind was the author of the treason, but said that they could not produce him because after the deed was done he had fled to the Northmen. But the others who had carried out his will and committed the crime they delivered up to the king to the number of four thousand and five hundred; and by the king's command they were all beheaded [decollati] in one day upon the river Aller in the place called Verden [Ferdun]. When he had wreaked vengeance after this fashion, the king withdrew to the town of Diedenhofen [Thionville]...

A short notice under the same year in the Annales Laubacenses (Annals of Lobbes) and the related Annales sancti Amandi (Annals of Saint-Amand) reads: "The rebellious Saxons killed many Franks; and Charles, [having] gathered the Saxons together, ordered them beheaded" (Saxones rebellantes plurimos Francos interfecerunt; et Karlus, congregatos Saxones, iussit eos decollare). For the year 782, the Annales Sangallenses Baluzii are more cryptic: "this year the Lord King Charles killed many Saxons" (hoc anno domnus rex Karolus plures de Saxonis interfecit).

== Scholarship ==
Historian Alessandro Barbero says that, regarding Charlemagne, the massacre "produced perhaps the greatest stain on his reputation". In his survey on scholarship regarding Charlemagne, Barbero comments on attempts at exonerating Charlemagne and his forces from the massacre:

Several historians have attempted to lessen Charles's responsibility for the massacre, by stressing that until a few months earlier the king thought he had pacified the country, the Saxon nobles had sworn allegiance, and many of them had been appointed counts. Thus the rebellion constituted an act of treason punishable by death, the same penalty that the extremely harsh Saxon law imposed with great facility, even for the most insignificant of crimes. Others have attempted to twist the accounts provided by sources, arguing that the Saxons were killed in battle and not massacred in cold blood, or even that the verb decollare (to decapitate) was a copyist's error in place of delocare (to relocate), so the prisoners were deported. None of these attempts has proved credible.

He continues: "the most likely inspiration for the mass execution of Verden was the Bible", Charlemagne desiring "to act like a true King of Israel", citing the biblical tale of the total extermination of the Amalekites and the conquest of the Moabites by David. Barbero further points out that a few years later, a royal chronicler, commenting on Charlemagne's treatment of the Saxons, records that "either they were defeated or subjected to the Christian religion or completely swept away."

Roger Collins identifies the victims of the massacre as all Saxons held to have participated in the battle of the Süntel. Charlemagne may have found his precedent for mass execution in the Council of Cannstatt of 745/6, whereat his uncle Carloman executed numerous leading Alemannic noblemen.

The German historian Martin Lintzel argued that the figure of 4,500 was an exaggeration, partly based on the theory of Hans Delbrück regarding the small size of early medieval armies. On the other hand, Bernard Bachrach argues that the 4,500 captured warriors were but a small fraction of the able-bodied men in the region. The annalist's figure of 4,500, he notes, is generally accepted by scholars. He puts it at less than the entire Saxon army that fought at the Süntel, and suggests that Widukind's personal retinue probably also escaped capture.

The medievalist Henry Mayr-Harting argues that since "reputation was of the highest importance to the warrior element of a heroic-age society" the massacre of Verden, whatever its actual scope, would have backfired on Charlemagne:

On the reputational side during Charlemagne's wars, the Saxons' greatest gain will undoubtedly have been the blood bath of Verden in 783 [sic]. If but one tenth of the 4500 warriors said to have been slaughtered actually fell under the Frankish swords, think what a series of laments for fallen warriors, what a Gododdin, what a subsequent celebration of reputation by poets, that would have made possible!

He further argues that the Saxons were probably unable to mount another serious revolt for several years after Verden, since they had to wait for a new generation of young men to reach fighting age.

Matthias Becher, in his biography of Charlemagne, suggests that a much smaller number of executions accompanied deportations in the year 782. Carole Cusack interprets the method of execution as hanging rather than beheading.

The Capitulatio de partibus Saxoniae, a law code promulgated by Charlemagne, has traditionally been dated to 782–85, in response to Widukind's rebellion. More recently, Yitzhak Hen has suggested a later date (c. 795), based on the influence of Islamic theology of jihad through the Spaniard Theodulf of Orléans. This theory has not found wide acceptance.

Janet L. Nelson calls the massacre "exemplary legal vengeance for the deaths of [Charlemagne's ministers] and their men in the Süntel Hills". According to her, even if the Frankish leaders at the Süntel were at fault for the disaster, as the Annales qui dicuntur Einhardi imply, Charlemagne as their lord, according to the standards of the time, owed them vengeance. Nelson says that the method of mass execution—decollatio, beheading—was also chosen for its symbolic value, for it was the Roman penalty for traitors and oath-breakers.

== Legacy ==
The massacre became particularly significant and controversial among German nationalists in the late 19th and early 20th centuries and in Nazi Germany. In 1935, landscape architect Wilhelm Hübotter designed a memorial, known as the Sachsenhain ("Saxon Grove"), that was built at a possible site of the massacre. This site functioned for a period as a meeting place for the Schutzstaffel. Popular discussion of the massacre made Charlemagne a controversial figure in Nazi Germany until his official "rehabilitation" by Adolf Hitler and Joseph Goebbels, after which Charlemagne was officially presented in a positive manner in Nazi Germany.

=== Assessments before 1933 ===
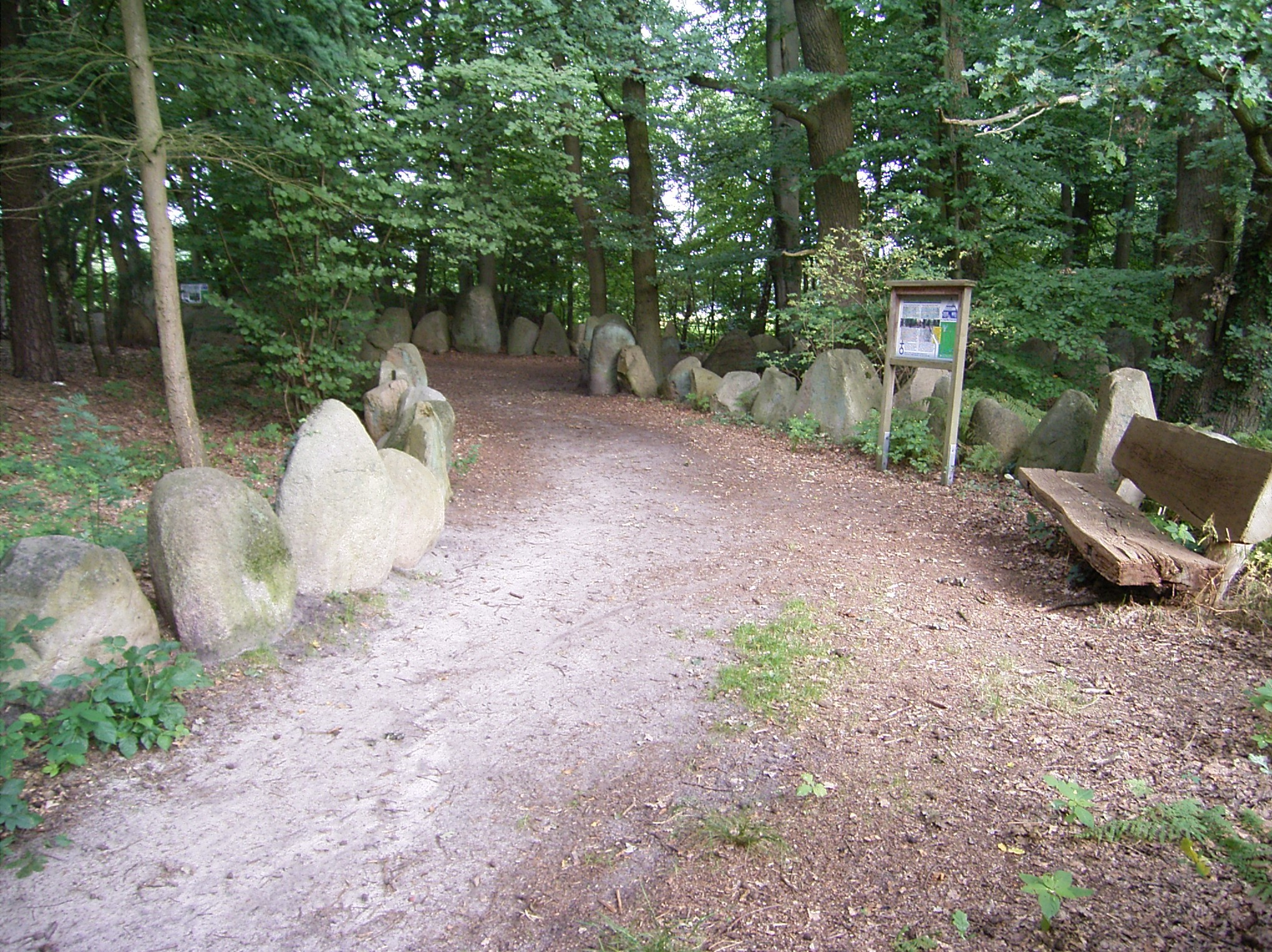
The Sachsenhain, a Nazi-era memorial to the massacre in Verden an der Aller, Germany

In the sixteenth and seventeenth centuries, historians generally approved of the executions of Verden, as displays of piety. During the Enlightenment this changed. Gottfried Wilhelm Leibniz was one of the first to suggest that Verden cast a shadow over Charlemagne's legacy. Voltaire considered the king a "thousandfold murderer", with Verden the centrepiece of his barbarism.

According to Barbero, the incident would be little more than a footnote in scholarship were it not for controversy in German circles due to nationalistic sentiment before and during the Nazi era in Germany. The controversy over the massacre was linked to disputes among German nationalists about the image of Charlemagne. Some Germans saw the victims of the massacre as defenders of Germany's traditional beliefs, resisting the foreign religion of Christianity. Wilhelm Teudt mentions the site of the massacre in his 1929 book Germanische Heiligtümer ('Germanic Shrines'). Some Christian nationalists linked Charlemagne with the humiliation of French domination after World War I, especially the occupation of the Rhineland. Of the first generation of German historians after 1871 to defend Charlemagne, Louis Halphen considered their efforts a failure.

=== Nazi Germany ===
Hermann Gauch, Heinrich Himmler's adjutant for culture, took the view that Charlemagne – known in German as Karl the Great (German: Karl der Große) – should be officially renamed "Karl the Slaughterer" because of the massacre. He advocated a memorial to the victims. Alfred Rosenberg also stated that the Saxon leader Widukind, not Karl, should be called "the Great". In Nazi Germany, the massacre became a major topic of debate. In 1934, two plays about Widukind were performed. The first, Der Sieger (The Victor) by Friedrich Forster, portrayed Charlemagne as brutal but his goal, Christianization of the pagan Saxons, as necessary. Reception was mixed. The second, Wittekind, by Edmund Kiß, was more controversial for its criticism of Christianity. The play resulted in serious disturbances and was stopped after just two performances. Described by one historian as "little more than an extended anti-Catholic rant", the plot depicted Charlemagne as a murderous tyrant and Verden as "attempted genocide plotted by the Church."

In 1935, landscape architect Wilhelm Hübotter was commissioned to build the Sachsenhain (German 'Grove of the Saxons') in Verden, a monument commemorating the massacre consisting of 4,500 large stones. The monument was used as both a memorial to the event and as a meeting place for the Schutzstaffel. The memorial was inscribed to "Baptism-Resistant Germans Massacred by Karl, the Slaughterer of the Saxons". In the same year the annual celebration of Charlemagne in Aachen, where he is buried, was cancelled and replaced by a lecture on "Karl the Great, Saxon Butcher." The attacks on Charlemagne as Sachsenschlächter (slaughterer of the Saxons) and a tool of the Church and the Papacy were led by Alfred Rosenberg. In 1935, seven professional historians fought back with the volume Karl der Große oder Charlemagne? The issue was settled by Adolf Hitler himself, who privately pressured Rosenberg to cease his public condemnations, and by propagandist Joseph Goebbels, who began to issue positive statements about Charlemagne. In 1936, the Nazi historian Heinrich Dannenbauer could refer to Charlemagne's "rehabilitation". A memorial site, Widukindgedächtnisstätte, was inaugurated at Engen in 1939.

In 1942, the Nazi regime celebrated the 1200th anniversary of Charlemagne's birth. The historian Ahasver von Brandt referred to it as the "official rehabilitation" (amtliche Rehabilitierung), although Goebbels acknowledged in private that many people were confused by the about-face of National Socialism. A Sicherheitsdienst report of 9 April 1942 noted that:

There were many voices to be heard saying that only a few years ago one had counted as an unreliable National Socialist had one left Karl der Große with so much as a single unblemished feature and not spoken also in tones of loathing of the "slaughterer of Saxons" and "pope's and bishops' lacky". Many people pose the question as to who in the Party it had been back then who had authorised this derogatory slogan, and from what quarter this completely different evaluation was coming now.

Goebbels's opinion was that it was best for state propaganda on historical matters to align with popular opinion, and thus with and not against Charlemagne.

As an example of Charlemagne's post-1935 rehabilitation in Nazi Germany, in 1944 the 33rd Waffen Grenadier Division of the SS Charlemagne, a body of French volunteers, was named after the "pan-European Germanic hero" instead of after Joan of Arc.
