= Cyneheard the Ætheling =

Brother of King Sigeberht of Wessex and murderer of King Cynewulf

Cyneheard the Ætheling (died 786) was the brother of Sigeberht, briefly King of Wessex. Sigeberht was deposed in 757 with the agreement of the Witan. Cynewulf of Wessex succeeded as King.

In 786 Cynewulf "wished to drive out" Cyneheard. Cynewulf went, thinly attended, to a lady at 'Merantune'. Cyneheard with his men surrounded Cynewulf, who fought bravely and wounded Cyneheard before himself being slain. The following events, described in the Anglo-Saxon Chronicle under the year AD 755, are a classic of warrior loyalty and it has been suggested that they may be a traditional story rather than a strictly accurate report.

The atheling immediately offered Cynewulf's men life and rewards; which none of them would accept, but continued fighting together against him, till they all lay dead, except one British hostage, and he was severely wounded. When the king's thanes that were behind heard in the morning that the king was slain, they rode to the spot, Osric his ealdorman, and Wiverth his thane, and the men that he had left behind; and they met the atheling at the town, where the king lay slain. The gates, however, were locked against them, which they attempted to force; but he promised them their own choice of money and land, if they would grant him the kingdom; reminding them, that their relatives were already with him, who would never desert him. To which they answered, that no relative could be dearer to them than their lord, and that they would never follow his murderer. Then they besought their relatives to depart from him, safe and sound. They replied, that the same request was made to their comrades that were formerly with the king; "And we are as regardless of the result," they rejoined, "as our comrades who with the king were slain." Then they continued fighting at the gates, till they rushed in, and slew the atheling and all the men that were with him; except one, who was the godson of the aldorman, and whose life he spared, though he was often wounded.

The murder of Cynewulf is placed by modern historians, including the Rev G. H. Godwin, at Marten, a hamlet in the county of Wiltshire. It has also been considered to have taken place at Merton in Surrey.
