= Battle of Süntel =

782 battle

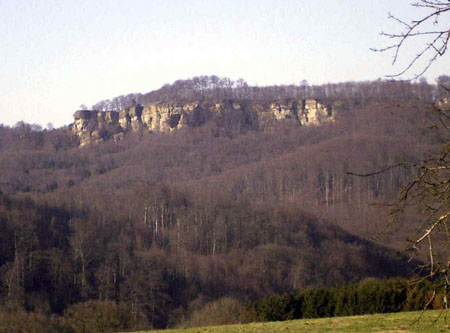
- Cliff in Süntel Mountains
Date	782
Location	Weser Uplands 52°12′38″N 9°20′01″E
Result	Saxon victory

Belligerents
Franks; Obotrites	Saxons; Frisians

Commanders and leaders
Adalgis †; Geilo †; Worad	
- Location within Lower Saxony Battle of Süntel (Germany)

The Battle of Süntel was a land battle that took place between Saxon rebels led by Widukind and a detachment of Frankish forces led by envoys of Charlemagne named Adalgis, Geilo, and Worad at Süntel in 782 during the Saxon Wars. The result was a victory for the Saxons, resulting in the deaths of Adalgis, Geilo, four counts, and 20 other noblemen. Shortly following the loss, Charlemagne had 4,500 rebels beheaded on a single day, in an event sometimes known as the Verden Massacre.

== Sources ==
- Cosack, E. Der altsächsische "Heidenkirchhof" bei Sarstedt, Ldkr. Hildesheim, und die Schlacht am Süntel 782, 2007.
- Heimbs, G. Die Amelungsburg am Süntel und die Schlacht vom Jahre 782; In: Die Kunde 12, 1944.
- Royal Frankish Annals, in Scholz, B. W. (ed.), Carolingian Chronicles (Ann Arbor, 1970), pp. 37– 125.
