= Ōnakatomi no Kiyomaro =

Japanese noble of the Nara period

Ōnakatomi no Kiyomaro 大中臣清麻呂
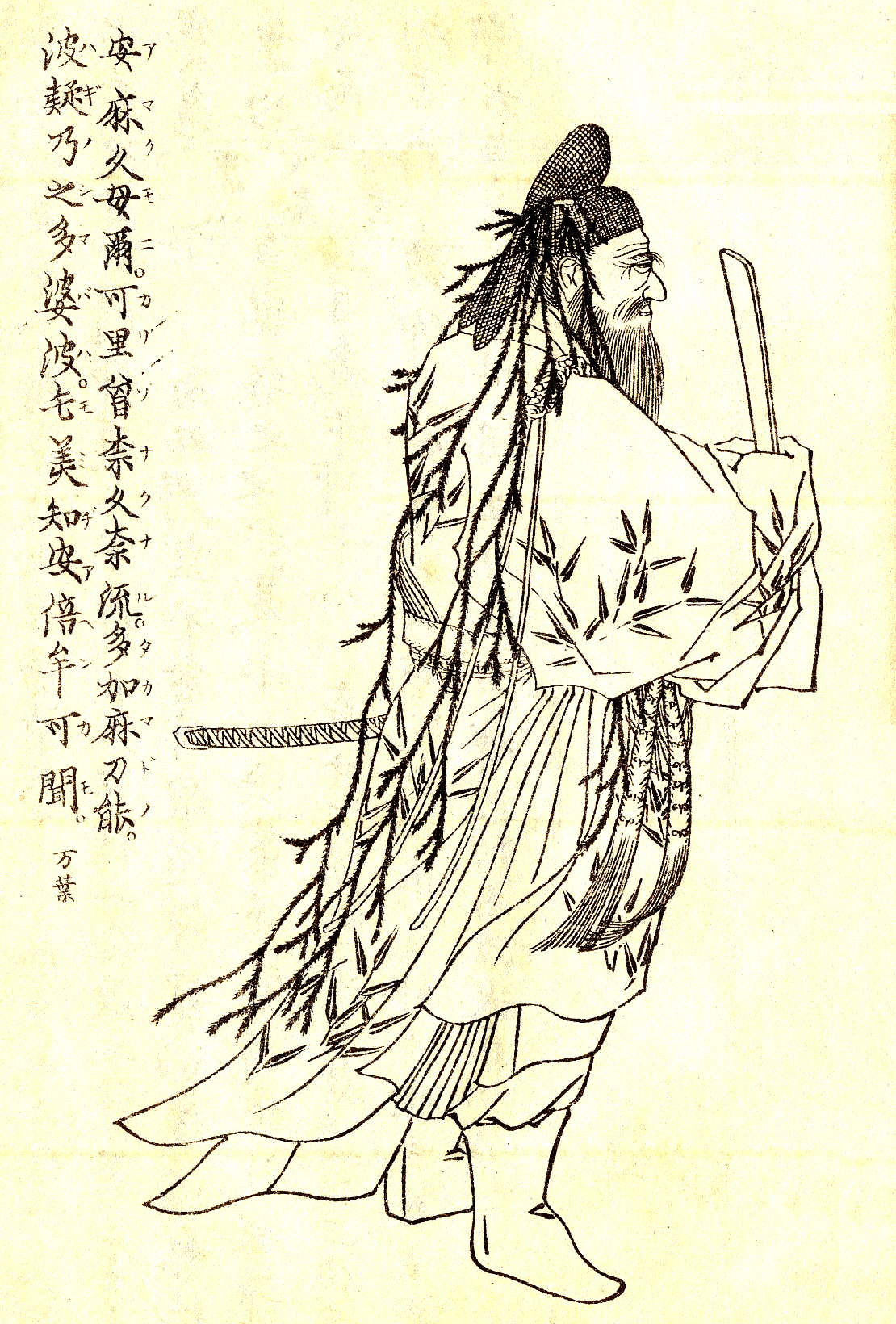
- Illustration by Kikuchi Yōsai, from Zenken Kojitsu
- Born: 702
- Died: September 6, 788
- Father: Nakatomi no Omimaro

Ōnakatomi no Kiyomaro (大中臣 清麻呂; 702 – September 6, 788) was a Japanese noble of the Nara period. Born the seventh son of the chūnagon Nakatomi no Omimaro of the Nakatomi clan, he changed his name and founded the Ōnakatomi clan. He reached the court rank of shō ni-i (正二位) and the position of udaijin.

== Life ==
After passing through a variety of inspector-level positions, Kiyomaro was in 743 promoted to assistant director of the Jingi-kan and granted the rank of ju go-i no ge (従五位下). In 747, in the last days of the court of Emperor Shōmu, he was moved to a regional position as governor of Owari Province. In 751, though, the new Empress Kōken promoted Kiyomaro to ju go-i no jō (従五位上), and in 754 he was restored to his position in the Jingi-kan and subsequently given the position of sachūben (左中弁) in the Daijō-kan.

Under the administration of Fujiwara no Nakamaro, Kiyomaro advanced steadily. He was promoted to shō go-i no ge (正五位下) in 757, shō go-i no jō (正五位上) in 759. In 762 he rose to ju shi-i no ge (従四位下), and at the end of the year Kiyomaro was promoted to sangi, joining the ranks of the kugyō along with Nakamaro's sons Kusumaro and Asakari. In this same year he also served with Kusumaro and Kamitsumichi no Hitatsu (上道斐太都) in the empresses' palace, transmitting imperial decrees. In 763 he was promoted to sadaiben (左大弁) and director of Settsu Province. Early in 764, he was promoted to ju shi-i no jō (従四位上).

Later that year, though, Nakamaro rebelled, and Kiyomaro supported the Empress Kōken's side against him. The ex-Empress was victorious and retook the throne, and Kiyomaro was promoted to shō shi-i no ge (正四位下). In the next year, 765, he was further awarded honors, second class, for his service. At the banquet after Kōken's re-enthronement ceremony as Empress Shōtoku, Kiyomaro was in attendance as director of the Jingi-kan. The Empress praised him for his integrity and industry in his long service in that organization, and he was promoted to ju san-mi (従三位).

Kiyomaro continued his rise in the courts of both Empress Shōtoku and Emperor Kōnin. In 768 he was promoted to chūnagon, and in 769 he changed his family name from Nakatomi no Ason to Ōnakatomi no Ason. In 771, Kiyomaro was appointed as a tutor to Crown Prince Osabe, but was dismissed from this role when the Crown Prince was disinherited the next year. In 773, he was re-appointed as tutor to the new Crown Prince Yamabe, the future Emperor Kanmu.

Meanwhile, in 770, Kiyomaro was promoted to shō san-mi (正三位) and dainagon, and in 771, following the deaths of sadaijin Fujiwara no Nagate and udaijin Kibi no Makibi, he was promoted to ju ni-i (従二位) and udaijin. In 772, he was promoted again to shō ni-i (正二位). In his role as udaijin, Kiyomaro headed the Daijō-kan until 780.

In 781, immediately following the ascension of Emperor Kanmu, Kiyomaro was allowed to retire at the age of 70. He died in 788, at the age of 87.

== Personality ==
As an old retainer familiar with the past days of the court, Kiyomaro memorized and was proficient in many court ceremonies. Even as he aged, he was diligent and never shirked his official duties.

Five of his poems are recorded in the Man'yōshū.

== Genealogy ==
- Father: Nakatomi no Omimaro (中臣意美麻呂)
- Mother: Tajihi no Akira (多治比阿伎良), daughter of Tajihi no Shima (多治比嶋)
- Wife: Tajihi no Koane (多治比子姉), ju ni-i (従二位) and Naishi-no-Kami (尚侍)
  - Fourth son: Ōnakatomi no Morona (大中臣諸魚; 743-797)
- Other children:
  - First son: Ōnakatomi no Sukunamaro (大中臣宿奈麻呂)
  - Second son: Ōnakatomi no Kōyu (大中臣子老; ?-789)
  - Third son: Ōnakatomi no Tsugumaro (大中臣継麿)
  - Son: Ōnakatomi no Okina (大中臣老人)
  - Son: Ōnakatomi no Imamaro (大中臣今麿)
  - Daughter: wife of Fujiwara no Takimaro (藤原瀧麻呂)
