= Capitulatio de partibus Saxoniae =

Legal code issued by Charlemagne

Capitulatio de partibus Saxoniae (Latin, variously translated as 'Ordinances concerning Saxony' or the 'Saxon Capitularies' or 'Capitulary of Paderborn') was a legal code issued by Charlemagne and promulgated amongst the Saxons during the Saxon Wars. Traditionally dated to Charlemagne's 782 campaign, and occasionally to 785, the much later date of 795 is also considered possible. Despite the laws, some Saxons continued to reject Charlemagne's rule and attempts at Christianization, with some continuing to rebel even after Charlemagne's death (such as the Stellinga uprising). The Saxons responded to Charlemagne's Christianization efforts by destroying encroaching churches and injuring or killing missionary priests and monks, and the law marks Charlemagne's effort "to impose Christianity on the Saxons by the same force that Charlemagne applied in imposing Carolingian political authority".

The laws of Capitulatio de partibus Saxoniae are focused on the Christianization of the pagan Saxons.

1. Whoever makes violent entry into a church and forcibly or secretly steals any object or burns the building shall die.

8. If any one of the race of the Saxons hereafter concealed among them shall have wished to hide himself unbaptized, and shall have scorned to come to baptism and shall have wished to remain a pagan, let him be punished by death.

Many religious practices were also forbidden such as making votive offerings to "demons", trees and wells.

Scholar Pierre Riché refers to the code as a "terror capitulary" and notes that the Massacre of Verden, in which Charlemagne ordered 4,500 imprisoned Saxons massacred in 782, may be seen as a preface to the legal code.

According to the Encyclopædia Britannica, "although not necessarily abrogating the earlier decree, [the 797 Saxon capitulary] replaced the harsher measures of the earlier capitulary with conversion through less brutal methods".
