= Sahl ibn Bishr =

Syriac astronomer and astrologer

Sahl ibn Bishr al-Israili
- ابوعثمان سهل بن حبیب بن هانی
- Born: c. 786
- Died: c. 845
- Occupations: Astrologer, astronomer, and mathematician
- Children: Ali ibn Sahl Rabban al-Tabari

Sahl ibn Bishr al-Israili (Note: Persian: ابوعثمان سهل بن حبیب بن هانی) (c. 786 – c. 845) (Note: Latinised as Zael or Zahel, also known as Haya al-Yahudi ("the Jew") and Rabban al-Tabari (Persian: ربان طبری)) was a Jewish or Syriac Christian astrologer, astronomer and mathematician from Tabaristan. He was the father of Ali ibn Sahl the scientist and physician, who became a convert to Islam.

He served as astrologer to the governor of Khuristan and then to the vizier of Baghdad. He wrote books on astronomy, astrology, and arithmetic, all in Arabic.

== His works ==
Sahl is believed to be the first who translated the Almagest of Ptolemy into Arabic.

Sahl ibn Bishr wrote in the Greek astrological tradition. Sahl's first five books were preserved in the translation of John of Seville (Johannes Hispanus) (c. 1090 – c. 1150). See the English translation The Introduction to the Science of the Judgments of the Stars. Translated by James Herschel Holden (Tempe, Az.: A.F.A., Inc., 2008)ix, 213 pp. The sixth book deals with three thematic topics regarding the influences on the world and its inhabitants was translated by Herman of Carinthia. The work contains divinations based on the movements of the planets and comets.

Books by Sahl ibn Bishr in Arabic include:

- Ahkam fi al-Nujum (Laws of the Astrology)
- Kitab al-ikhtiyarat 'ala al-buyut al-ithnai 'ashar (Book of elections according to the twelve houses).
- al-Masa'il al-Nujumiyah (The astrological problems)
