= Al-Rabi ibn Yunus =

Al-Rabīʾ ibn Yūnus ibn ʿAbd Allāh ibn Abī Farwa (Arabic: الربيع بن يونس بن عبدالله بن أبي فروة; c. 730 – 785/6) was a freedman who became one of the leading ministers of the early Abbasid Caliphate, serving under the caliphs al-Mansur (r. 754–775), al-Mahdi (r. 775–785) and al-Hadi (r. 785–786).

Al-Rabi’ was born to a slave woman near Medina about 730 CE. His father Yunus, the scion of a well-to-do family, denied his paternity, and the infant was sent to another family and eventually to an estate in the desert where he was reduced to menial labour. He was however bought by Ziyad ibn Ubayd Allah al-Harithi, the governor of Medina, who in turn presented him as a gift to al-Saffah, the first Abbasid caliph. Noted by al-Mansur for his literary education and especially his ability in Arabic poetry, he rose to prominence within the Abbasid court, culminating in his appointment as hadjib (chamberlain) and eventually vizier. He is often mentioned in the histories as a powerful figure, controlling access to the Caliph, and a capable administrator. He supervised the construction of Karkh, the commercial extramural suburb of Baghdad, as well as the so-called Palace of Eternity (Qasr al-Khuld), where the Caliphs preferred to stay. Al-Rabi' even received from al-Mansur one quarter of the new city as a grant and named after him (kati’at al-Rabi’).

He was an ally of al-Khayzuran throughout the reigns of al-Mahdi and al-Hadi. He was instrumental in ensuring the smooth succession of al-Mahdi, but he was replaced as vizier by Abu Ubayd Allah, and returned to his post as hadjib, which had in the meantime been held by his son al-Fadl ibn al-Rabi'. When Abu Ubayd Allah insulted him during a visit, al-Rabi’ brought about the former's downfall in 779/780, by accusing and proving his son to be a non-believer. He did not return to the post of vizier, however, until the reign of al-Hadi, when for a short while he was vizier, hadjib and head of the chancery. Soon after however, he was replaced and kept only the direction of the diwan al-azimma (the budget department). He died in early 785 or early 786. His son al-Fadl occupied a similarly influential position in the court of Harun al-Rashid (r. 786–809) after him.

== Sources ==
- Atiya, A.S. (1995). "Al-Rabīʾ b. Yūnus". In Bosworth, C. E.; van Donzel, E.; Heinrichs, W. P. & Lecomte, G. (eds.). The Encyclopaedia of Islam, Second Edition. Volume VIII: Ned–Sam. Leiden: E. J. Brill. pp. 350–351. ISBN 978-90-04-09834-3.
- Kennedy, Hugh (2006). When Baghdad Ruled the Muslim World: The Rise and Fall of Islam's Greatest Dynasty. Cambridge, MA: Da Capo Press. ISBN 978-0-306814808.
