= Saxon Wars =

Campaigns and insurrections of 772–804

- Frankish expansion from 481 to 814
Date	772–804
Location	Saxony, Polabian Slav territories, Frisia, Austrasia
Result	Frankish victory: Conversion of the Saxons to Christianity
Territorial changes	Frankish annexation of Saxony; Nordalbingia given to the Obotrite Confederacy

Belligerents
Carolingian Empire; Obotrite Confederacy	Saxons; Frisians

Commanders and leaders
Charlemagne; Chamberlain Adalgisile †; Constable Geilo †; Count Palatine Worad †; Count Theodoric †	Widukind (surrendered)

Casualties and losses
Unknown	4,500 executed in 782; 2,800–4,000 killed in 798; 7,070 deported in 795; 1,600 deported in 798; 10,000 deported in 804

The Saxon Wars were 32 years of campaigns and insurrections from 772, when Charlemagne first entered Saxony with the intent to conquer, to 804 when the last rebellion of tribesmen was defeated. In all, 18 campaigns were fought, primarily in what is now northern Germany. They resulted in the incorporation of Saxony into the Frankish realm and their forcible conversion from Germanic paganism to Christianity.

The Saxons were divided into four subgroups in four regions. Nearest to the Frankish kingdom of Austrasia was Westphalia, and farthest was Eastphalia. In between the two kingdoms was Engria (or Engern), and to the north at the base of the Jutland peninsula was Nordalbingia. Despite repeated setbacks, the Saxons resisted steadfastly, returning to raid Charlemagne's domains as soon as he turned his attention elsewhere. Their main leader Widukind was a resilient and resourceful opponent, but he was defeated and baptized in 785.

== First phase ==
In January 772, the sacking and burning of the church of Deventer by a Saxon expedition was the casus belli for the first war waged by Charlemagne against the Saxons. It began with a Frankish invasion of Saxon territory and the subjugation of the Engrians and destruction of their sacred symbol Irminsul near Paderborn in 772 or 773 at Eresburg. Irminsul may have been a hollow tree trunk, presumably representing the pillar supporting the skies—similar to the Nordic tree Yggdrasil and apparently a common belief among the Germanic peoples. Charlemagne's campaign led all the way to the Weser River and destroyed several major Saxon strongholds. After negotiating with some Saxon nobles and obtaining hostages, Charlemagne turned his attention to his war against the Lombards in northern Italy; but Saxon free tenants, led by Widukind, continued to resist and raided Frankish lands in the Rhine region. Armed confrontations continued unabated for years.

Charlemagne's second campaign came in 775. He marched through Westphalia, conquering the fort of Sigiburg, and crossed Engria, where he defeated the Saxons again. In Eastphalia, he defeated them, and their leader Hessi converted to Christianity. He returned through Westphalia, leaving encampments at Sigiburg and Eresburg. All of Saxony except Nordalbingia was under his control, but the recalcitrant Saxons would not submit for long.

After warring in Italy, he returned very rapidly to Saxony (making it to Lippe before the Saxons knew he left Italy) for the third time in 776, when a rebellion destroyed his fortress at Eresburg. The Saxons were once again brought to heel, though Widukind fled to the Danes. Charlemagne built a camp at Karlstadt. In 777, he called an imperial diet at Paderborn to integrate Saxony fully into the Frankish kingdom. Many Saxons were baptised. The Carmen de conversione Saxonum celebrates this event.

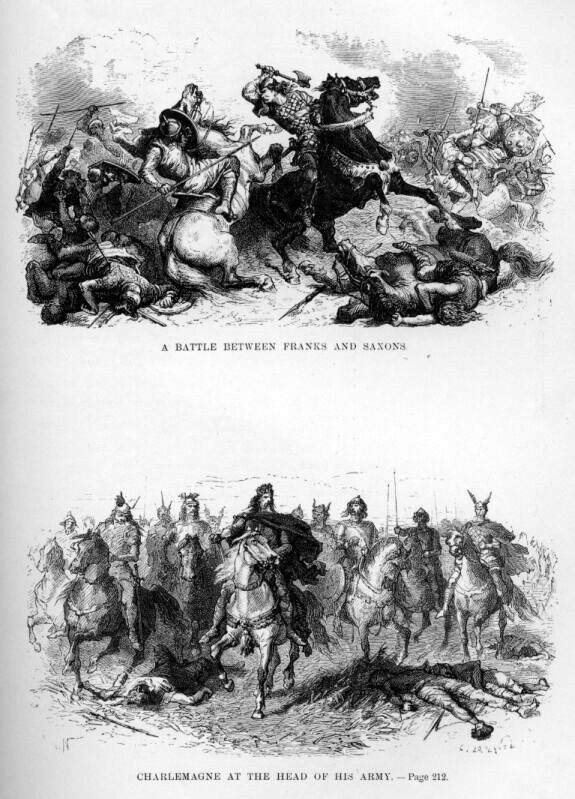
Charlemagne and the Saxons, A. de Neuville, c. 1869

The chief purpose of the diet was to bring Saxony closer to Christianity. Missionaries, mainly Anglo-Saxons from England, were recruited to carry out this task. Charlemagne issued decrees designed to break Saxon resistance and to inflict capital punishment on anyone observing heathen practices or disrespecting the king's peace. His severe and uncompromising position, which earned him the title "butcher of Saxons", caused his close adviser Alcuin of York to urge leniency, as God's word should be spread not by the sword but by persuasion; but the wars continued.

In summer 779, Charlemagne again went into Saxony and conquered Eastphalia, Engria, and Westphalia. At a diet near Lippspringe, he divided the land into missionary districts and Frankish countships. Charlemagne assisted in several mass baptisms in 780. He then returned to Italy, and there was no Saxon revolt. From 780 to 782, the land had peace.

== Middle phase ==
In 782 Charlemagne returned to Saxony and instituted a code of law, the Lex Frisionum, and appointed counts, both Saxon and Frank. The laws were severe on religious issues, namely the native paganism of the Saxons. This stirred a renewal of the old conflict. In the fall of 782 Widukind returned and led a revolt that resulted in many assaults on the church. The Saxons invaded the area of the Chatti, a Germanic tribe already converted by Saint Boniface and firmly in Charlemagne's empire. Widukind won the Battle of Süntel while Charles was campaigning against the Sorbs. It was in response to this setback that Charlemagne, at the Massacre of Verden, ordered the beheading of 4,500 Saxons who had rebelled. Upon this Blutgericht, some historians have stated the massacre did not happen, or that it was actually a battle, but according to Alessandro Barbero, none of these claims are credible. The action led to two straight years of constant warfare (783–785), with Charlemagne wintering in central Saxony, at Minden. Gradually, the Franks gained the upper hand. The turning point came in 785, when Widukind was baptized and swore fealty to Charlemagne. It was with the conclusion of this war that Charlemagne could have claimed to have conquered Saxony, and the land had peace for the next seven years, though revolts continued sporadically until 804.

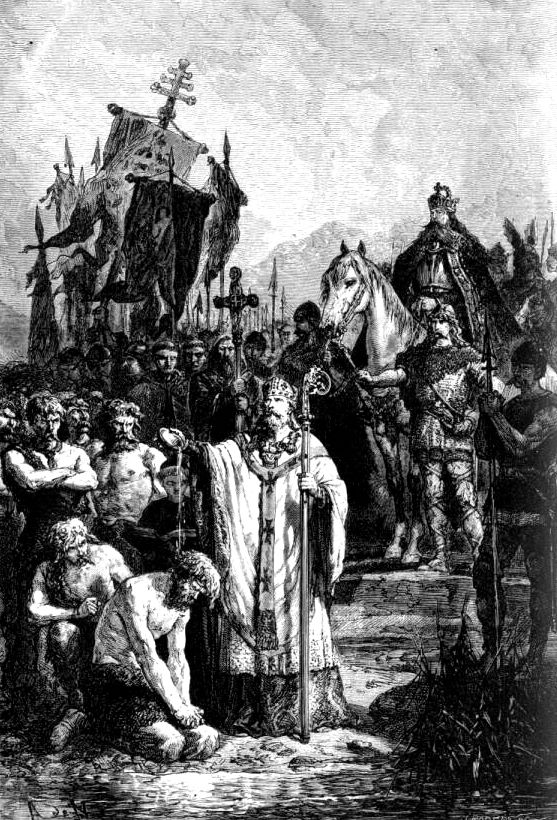
Conversion of the Saxons, A. de Neuville, c. 1869

== Final phase ==
In 792, the Westphalians rose up against their masters in response to forcible recruitment for wars against the Avars. The Eastphalians and Nordalbingians joined them in 793, but the insurrection did not catch on as previous ones and was completely put down by 794. An Engrian rebellion followed closely in 796, but Charlemagne's personal presence and the presence of loyal Christian Saxons and Slavs immediately crushed it. In the Battle of Bornhöved in 798, the Obotrite allies of Charlemagne under Thrasco defeated the Nordalbingian Saxons, killing 2,800–4,000 of them.

The last insurrection of the Engrian people occurred in 804, more than 30 years after Charlemagne's first campaign against them. This time, the most unruly tribe of them all, the Nordalbingians, found themselves effectively disempowered to rebel. Charlemagne deported 10,000 of them to Neustria and gave their now vacant lands to the loyal king of the Obotrites. Einhard, Charlemagne's biographer, said on the closing of the conflict:

The war that had lasted so many years was at length ended by their acceding to the terms offered by the King; which were renunciation of their national religious customs and the worship of devils, acceptance of the sacraments of the Christian faith and religion, and union with the Franks to form one people.

Towards the end of the wars, Charlemagne had begun to place more emphasis on reconciliation. In 797 he eased the special laws, and in 802 Saxon common law was codified as the Lex Saxonum. This was accompanied by the establishment of ecclesiastic structures (including bishoprics in Paderborn, Münster, Bremen, Minden, Verden and Osnabrück) that secured the conversion of the Saxon people. The last Saxon uprising was the Stellinga, which occurred between 841 and 845.

== Religious nature ==
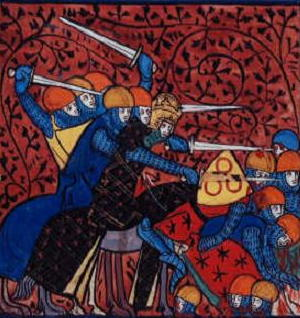
Charlemagne fighting the Saxons, from a 13th century miniature

Alluding to the Saxons, the contemporary poet of the Paderborn Epic praises terror as a means of conversion: "What the contrary mind and perverse soul refuse to do with persuasion, / Let them leap to accomplish when compelled by fear."

One of Charlemagne's famed capitularies outlined part of the religious intent of his interactions with the Saxons. In 785 he issued the Capitulatio de partibus Saxoniae which asserts, "If any one of the race of the Saxons hereafter concealed among them shall have wished to hide himself unbaptized, and shall have scorned to come to baptism and shall have wished to remain a pagan, let him be punished by death."

However, Alcuin took issue with the emperor's policy of forcing pagans to be baptised on pain of death, arguing, "Faith is a free act of the will, not a forced act. We must appeal to the conscience, not compel it by violence. You can force people to be baptised, but you cannot force them to believe." His arguments seem to have prevailed – Charlemagne abolished the death penalty for paganism in 797.

== See also ==
- Frisian–Frankish wars
