= 720s =

Decade

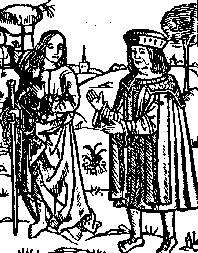
Illustration of John of Beverley, who died in 721

The 720s decade ran from January 1, 720, to December 31, 729.

== Events ==
=== 720 ===
==== By place ====
====== Byzantine Empire ======
- Summer – Emperor Leo III secures the Byzantine frontier, by inviting Slavic settlers into the depopulated districts of the Thracesian Theme (western Asia Minor). He undertakes a set of civil reforms, and reorganizes the theme structure in the Aegean region. Leo's 2-year-old son Constantine V is associated on the throne, and married to Tzitzak, daughter of the Khazar ruler (khagan) Bihar.

====== Europe ======
- Umayyad conquest of Gaul: Governor Al-Samh continues his campaign; he makes Narbonne the capital city of Muslim Septimania (Southern France), and uses it as a base for razzias. King Ardo is killed, and becomes the last ruler of the Visigothic Kingdom of Hispania. Some Visigoths refuse to adopt the Muslim faith, and flee north to Aquitaine. This marks the end of the Visigothic Kingdom.
- Muslim forces under Al-Samh begin the prolonged siege of Carcassonne, a fortified Visigothic town located in the Languedoc-Roussillon.

====== Britain ======
- King Ine of Wessex builds a stone church at Glastonbury Abbey in Somerset (approximate date).

====== Arabian Empire ======
- Umayyad conquest of Transoxiana: The first Turgesh attack on Muslim-Arabs in Transoxiana leads to the siege and relief of the Umayyad garrison at the fortress of Qasr al-Bahili, near Samarkand (or 721).
- Yazid ibn al-Muhallab, former governor of Iraq, revolts and is defeated at Basra, by Umayyad forces under Al-Abbas ibn al-Walid and Maslama ibn Abd al-Malik. He is arrested and later executed.
- February 10 – Caliph Umar II is poisoned by a servant, and dies in Aleppo (Syria) after a 3-year reign. He is succeeded by his cousin Yazid II.
- The Umayyad Caliphate reaches its greatest extent in Spain, controlling all of it except a small region in the north controlled by the Kingdom of Asturias.

====== Asia ======
- In the Chinese capital of Chang'an, the walls of a gated city ward collapse during the night, which unexpectedly forms a large pool out in the open. This is most likely caused by a sinkhole created when ground water eroded the limestone bedrock beneath. As a consequence of this, more than 500 homes are destroyed (approximate date).

====== Americas ======
- The Third Tikal-Calakmul War begins.

==== By topic ====
====== Literature ======
- The Nihon Shoki (日本書紀), one of the oldest history books in Japan, is completed under the editorial supervision of Prince Toneri, and with the assistance of Ō no Yasumaro.

====== Religion ======
- Contact between the Welsh Church and Yvi of Brittany is the last known link between two Celtic countries. After this, each nation goes its own separate way (approximate date).

====== Astronomy ======
- A second series of gravitational interactions with Saturn, the second since 1664 BC, once again force the Centaur (minor planet) Chiron into a new orbit, shifting it from orbiting in the edges of the Solar System to orbiting near the inner regions.

=== 721 ===
==== By place ====
====== Europe ======
- February 13 – King Chilperic II dies at Attigny (Ardennes), after a five-year reign. He is succeeded by Theuderic IV, infant son of Dagobert III, as Merovingian ruler of the Franks, under the control of the mayor of the palace, Charles Martel.
- Summer – Charles Martel restores the authority of the Austrasian palace throughout the Frankish Kingdom, including against Frankish-claimed Aquitaine and Provence (Southern France). He exiles Rigobert, bishop of Reims, to Gascony.
- June 9 – Battle of Toulouse: After besieging Toulouse for three months, Muslim forces under governor (wali) Al-Samh ibn Malik al-Khawlani are defeated by Eudes, duke of Aquitaine, preventing the extension of Umayyad control over Gaul.
- Anbasa ibn Suhaym Al-Kalbi is appointed governor of Al-Andalus, after the death of Al-Samh. The Muslims under Abdul Rahman al-Ghafiqi withdraw to Narbonne. The Visigothic duke Amrus of the Lerida area recognises Umayyad rule.
- Tervel, ruler (khagan) of the Bulgarian Empire, dies after a 21-year reign. He is succeeded by Kormesiy, possibly a son of Tervel, who is co-ruler and a descendant of the royal Dulo clan.
- Prague is founded (according to legend) by Princess Libuše and her husband Přemysl, founder of the Přemyslid dynasty (approximate date).

====== Britain ======
- King Ine of Wessex defeats Prince Cynewulf, an unknown relation making a push for the throne of Wessex.

====== Central America ======
- May 31 – Wak Chanil Ajaw (Lady Six Sky), who had been the regent for her son Kʼakʼ Tiliw Chan Chaak from 693 until his attainment of majority, becomes the new queen of the Mayan city state of Naranjo in Guatemala when K'ak Tiliw dies from unknown causes. She reigns until her death in 741.

====== China ======
- Rains and heavy storms around the southern seaport of Yangzhou destroy over 1,000 ships and boats in the Grand Canal, during the Tang dynasty (approximate date).

==== By topic ====
====== Religion ======
- Prüm Abbey is founded by Bertrada, daughter of former king Theuderic III, and her son Charibert, count of Laon (approximate date).

=== 722 ===
==== By place ====
====== Europe ======
- Summer – Battle of Covadonga: Visigothic nobleman Pelagius (Don Pelayo) defeats the Umayyad forces under Munuza, provincial governor of Asturias, at Picos de Europa (near Covadonga). This marks the beginning of the Reconquista, the Christian reconquest of the Iberian Peninsula. He founds the Kingdom of Asturias, and establishes a military base at Cangas de Onís (northwest of Spain) (or 718).

====== Britain ======
- King Ine of Wessex attempts a takeover of Dumnonia, but his armies are crushed, and he is forced to withdraw. Queen Æthelburg, wife of Ine, destroys the royal castle of Taunton, to prevent its seizure by rebels under Ealdbert.
- The Battle of Allen is fought close by the Hill of Allen (Ireland) between the Laigin, led by King Murchad mac Brain Mut, and the forces of Fergal mac Máele Dúin (High King of Ireland).
- Battle of Hehil: The West Saxons are defeated by a combined Viking and Cornish army, at Cornovii in Cornwall (approximate date).

====== Mesoamerica ======
- January 3 – King Kʼinich Ahkal Moʼ Nahb III takes the throne of the Maya city-state of Palenque (southern Mexico).

==== By topic ====
====== Religion ======
- November 30 – Wessex-born Boniface is ordained as bishop of Germany by Pope Gregory II. Under the protection of Charles Martel (mayor of the palace), he concentrates his religious work in Hessia and Thuringia.
- Emperor Leo III enforces the baptism of all Jews and Montanists in the Byzantine Empire.

=== 723 ===
==== By place ====
====== Asia ======
- Gunakamadeva, Lichhavi ruler (rajah), founds the city of Kathmandu (modern Nepal). During his reign, he transforms the agrarian society to an industrial city trading between India and Tibet.

==== By topic ====
====== Religion ======
- Boniface, Anglo-Saxon missionary, fells Thor's Oak (a sacred tree) near Fritzlar in Hesse, marking the decisive event in the Christianization of the northern Germanic tribes (approximate date).
- Boniface makes Büraburg, a fortified Frankish settlement, his temporary religious base.

=== 724 ===
==== By date ====
- January 26 – (24 Sha'ban 105 AH) Hisham ibn Abd al-Malik, becomes the new Caliph of the Umayyad Caliphate, which covers most of the Middle East, North Africa and Spain, after his brother Yazid II dies of tuberculosis following a 4-year reign. Hisham reigns for 19 years, during which he appoints Khalid al-Qasri as of Governor of Iraq
- February – Al-Jarrah ibn Abdallah of the Umayyad Caliphate inflicts a crushing defeat on the Khazars of what is now Russia in a battle fought between the Cyrus and Araxes Rivers.
- March 3 – Empress Genshō abdicates the throne, in favor of her 23-year-old nephew, Prince Obito, who becomes the 45th monarch of Japan as the Emperor Shōmu. He is the son of the late Emperor Monmu.
- March 6 – Muhammad ibn Abd al-Malik ibn Marwan, the son of the Caliph Abd al-Malik, is appointed as the Umayyad Governor of Egypt after Hanzala ibn Safwan al-Kalbi resigns. He serves for only two months.
- April – Athanasius III becomes the new Patriarch of the Syriac Orthodox Church, six months after the death of Elias I.
- May 2 – Muhammand ibn Marwan resigns as Governor of Egypt after a difference of opinion on policy, and is replaced by Al-Hurr ibn Yusuf.
- July 11 – Prince Æthelbert of the Kingdom of Kent issues a charter that is approved by his father, King Wihtred.
- August 15 – China's Emperor Xuanzong deposes his wife, the Empress consort Wang.
- December 29 – K'ak' Tiliw Chan Yopaat becomes king (ajaw) of the Maya city-state of Quiriguá, now in Guatemala), and serves for more than 60 years until his death in 785.

==== By place ====
====== Europe ======
- Ragenfrid, ex-mayor of the palace of Neustria, revolts against Charles Martel. He is easily defeated, and Ragenfrid gives up his sons as hostages, in return for being allowed to keep his lands in Anjou.
- Cináed mac Írgalaig, also known as "the one-eyed", becomes High King of Ireland.

====== Arabian Empire ======
- The Turgesh Khaganate scores a major victory over the Arabs, in the "Day of Thirst" near Khujand (modern Tajikistan).
- A Muslim fleet raids the Byzantine-ruled Balearic Islands, as well as Byzantine Sardinia and Lombard Corsica.

==== By topic ====
====== Architecture ======
- Shōmu orders that houses of the Japanese nobility be roofed with green tiles, as in China, and have white walls with red roof poles (approximate date).

====== Religion ======
- Pirmin, Visigothic monk, is appointed abbot of Mittelzell Abbey at Reichenau Island, which he has founded.
- Hugh of Champagne, grandson of Pepin of Herstal, is appointed bishop of Bayeux.

=== 725 ===
==== By place ====
====== Europe ======
- Umayyad conquest of Gaul: Muslim forces under Anbasa ibn Suhaym al-Kalbi (governor of Al-Andalus) capture the fortified town of Carcassonne, which has been under siege (see 720), as well as Nîmes in Septimania (the latter without resistance).
- Summer – al-Samh's successor, Anbasa ibn Suhaym al-Kalbi, moves against Gothic nobles resisting surrender. The city of Carcassonne is besieged, and its Gothic ruler forced to cede half of his territory, pay tribute, and make an offensive and defensive alliance with Muslim forces. The Gothic rulers of Nîmes and the other resisting Septimanian cities also eventually fall under the sway of the Umayyads.
- Duke Eudes of Aquitaine seeks an alliance with Munuza, governor of Cerdagne (eastern Pyrenees), currently in rebellion against the central Umayyad government at Córdoba in Andalusia (probably not cemented until 729).
- Charles Martel invades Bavaria, and kills Duke Grimoald in battle. His son Hugbert submits to Frankish suzerainty, and Charles brings back the Agilolfing princess Swanachild, who becomes his concubine (later his wife).
- King Liutprand puts Corsica, nominally under Byzantine authority, under Lombard government, defending it from Muslim raids (approximate date).

====== Britain ======
- The exiled prince Ealdbert, possibly a nephew of King Ine of Wessex looking for recognition as his heir, seeks sanctuary in Sussex. Ine attacks the South Saxons and kills Ealdbert.
- April 23 – King Wihtred of Kent dies after a 35-year reign. The kingdom is divided between his three sons: Æthelbert II as overking, Eadbert I in West Kent and Alric.

====== China ======
- Yi Xing, Chinese Buddhist monk and astronomer, applies a clockwork escapement mechanism, to provide rotating motion to his astronomical armillary sphere.

==== By topic ====
====== Literature ======
- Bede, Northumbrian monk-historian, writes The Reckoning of Time (De temporum ratione), explaining how to calculate medieval Easter.

====== Religion ======
- In Egypt, resentment of the Copts against Umayyad taxation (called jizya) leads to a revolt (approximate date).

=== 726 ===
==== By place ====
====== Byzantine Empire ======
- Emperor Leo III issues a series of edicts banning the veneration of images (726–729), and launching the iconoclastic controversies. Most of the clergy – particularly in Italy and Greece – are opposed to these edicts with uncompromising hostility, and in the western parts of the Byzantine Empire the people refuse to obey his religious reforms.
- Arab–Byzantine War: Muslim forces under Maslama ibn Abd al-Malik resume their expedition against Anatolia (modern Turkey). In a large-scale raid they plunder the fortress city of Caesarea.

====== Europe ======
- Umayyad conquest of Gaul: Muslim raiders under Abdul Rahman al-Ghafiqi, current governor of Septimania, devastate Avignon, Viviers, Valence, Vienne and Lyon (approximate date).
- Marcello Tegalliano, second Doge of Venice, dies after a 9-year reign.
- Uprising in Venice against Byzantium: The cause of mass unrest is the iconoclastic decrees of Emperor Leo III. A few days later, political demands are put forward for wide autonomy within the Byzantine Empire and the right to appoint the ruler of the region (Doge). The rebels elect Orso Ipato the Doge of Venice. Desiring to preserve the proceeds of the treasury from the second most important port of the Byzantine Empire, and not having the resources to cope with a well-fortified and armed region, Byzantium agrees with all the requirements put forward. Orso Ipato is recognised by Leo III, who gives him the title hypatos. The Venetian fleet, led by Orso Ipato, frees Ravenna from the Lombards and restores the power of the Byzantine governor there.
- Seismic activity in the Mediterranean Sea: The volcanic island of Thera erupts, while the city of Jerash (in present-day Jordan) suffers a major earthquake.

====== Britain ======
- King Ine of Wessex resigns his crown, and travels on a pilgrimage to Rome. He is succeeded by his brother-in-law (and probably distant cousin) Æthelheard.
- Dúngal mac Selbaig is deposed as king of Dál Riata (Scotland). He is succeeded by Eochaid mac Echdach (a son of former king Eochaid mac Domangairt).

====== Asia ======
- The first annual Sumo tournament in Japan is held by Emperor Shōmu (approximate date).

====== Central America ======
- October 22 – Itzamnaaj K'awiil, the ruler of the Mayan city state at Dos Pilas in Guatemala since 698, dies after a 28-year reign.

==== By topic ====
====== Religion ======
- Abbo of Provence, Frankish nobleman, founds Novalesa Abbey in Piedmont (Northern Italy).

=== 727 ===
==== By place ====
====== Byzantine Empire ======
- A revolt breaks out in Greece against the religious policies of Emperor Leo III (see 726). A rebel fleet under Agallianos Kontoskeles sets out for Constantinople with Kosmas, an anti-emperor, but is destroyed by the Byzantine fleet through the use of Greek fire.
- Siege of Nicaea: Muslim forces under Mu'awiya ibn Hisham (son of Umayyad caliph Hisham ibn Abd al-Malik) penetrate deep into Asia Minor, and sack the fortress city of Gangra, but unsuccessfully lay siege to Nicaea (northwestern Anatolia).

====== Europe ======
- A revolt breaks out in Italy against Leo's Iconoclasm; this results in the independence of the Exarchate of Ravenna, after part of a Byzantine invasion force is lost in a storm in the Adriatic Sea, and the remainder of Byzantine troops are repulsed.
- King Liutprand takes advantage of the anti-imperial turmoil. He conquers Bologna and other cities beyond the Po River (Northern Italy). The Lombards take "Classis", the strategic seaport of Ravenna, and overrun the Pentapolis.

====== Asia ======
- Arab–Khazar War: The Khazars drive back the Muslim invasion, led by Maslama ibn Abd al-Malik, into Mesopotamia. Reinforced with Syrian troops, Maslama counterattacks and takes Georgia, establishing the northern frontier on the Caucasus.

====== Central America ======
- January 6 – Ucha'an K'in B'alam becomes the new ruler of the Mayan city state at Dos Pilas in Guatemala after the death of Itzamnaaj K'awiil and reigns until 741.

==== By topic ====
====== Religion ======
- July – Pope Gregory II condemns iconoclasm at Rome, causing Italy to break with the Byzantine Empire. He becomes the virtual temporal ruler of most Byzantine possessions.

=== 728 ===
==== By place ====
====== Europe ======
- King Liutprand of the Lombards occupies all of the Exarchate of Ravenna. He advances towards Rome along the Via Cassia, and is met at the city of Sutri by Pope Gregory II, near the borders of the Duchy of Rome. Liutprand signs the Donation of Sutri, by which parts of Latium are given to the papacy (the first extension of papal territory in Italy). This marks the historical foundation of the Papal States.

=== 729 ===
==== By place ====
====== Europe ======
- Battle of Ravenna: Byzantine troops under Eutychius, exarch of Ravenna, are defeated by an Italian force, raised by Gregory II, in opposition to iconoclasm.
- An alliance between Duke Eudes of Aquitaine and Munuza, the Moorish governor of Cerdanya, is cemented by marriage to Eudes' illegitimate daughter Lampégia.
- In Denmark, construction of the Kanhave Canal across the island of Samsø is completed. Although the canal is only about 500 metres long, it is one of the largest engineering projects undertaken in Denmark during the Early Middle Ages.

====== Britain ======
- King Osric of Northumbria nominates Ceolwulf, a distant cousin and brother of Coenred, as his successor. After Osric's death, Ceolwulf takes the throne.

====== Asia ======
- Battle of Baykand: The Umayyad Arabs narrowly escape disaster when cut off from water by the Turgesh, and push through to reach Bukhara in Transoxiana.
- Siege of Kamarja: A small Arab garrison defends the fortress of Kamarja against the Turgesh for 58 days, ending with a negotiated withdrawal to Samarkand.

==== By topic ====
====== Food and drink ======
- Chinese eating sticks are introduced in the next 20 years in Japan, where people heretofore have used one-piece pincers. The Japanese call them hashi.

== Significant people ==
- Yazid II
- Hisham
- Leo III the Isaurian
- Pope Gregory II

== Births ==
720

- Baizhang Huaihai, Chinese Zen Buddhist monk (d. 814)
- Bernard, Frankish nobleman (approximate date)
- Bertrada of Laon, wife of Pippin the Short (d. 783)
- Modestus, Irish missionary (approximate date)
- Thierry IV, Frankish nobleman (approximate date)

721

- Abul Abbas al-Saffah, Muslim caliph (approximate date)
- Fujiwara no Uona, Japanese minister (d. 783)
- Jābir ibn Hayyān, Muslim alchemist (approximate date)
- Tachibana no Naramaro, Japanese statesman (d. 757)

722

- Fruela I, king of Asturias (approximate date)
- Isma'il ibn Ja'far, Shī‘ah Imām and scholar (or 719)

723

- Arbeo, bishop of Freising (approximate date)
- Isonokami no Yakatsugu, Japanese nobleman (d. 781)

724

- Dong Jin, Chinese official and general
- Fujiwara no Hamanari, Japanese noble and poet

725

- Paul the Deacon, Lombard monk (approximate date)
- Stephen the Hymnographer, Syrian monk (d. 807)

726

- Grifo, Frankish duke and son of Charles Martel (d. 753)
- Paulinus II, patriarch of Aquileia (approximate date)

727

- Abu Muslim Khorasani, Muslim general (latest estimated date; d. 755)
- January 9 – Dai Zong, emperor of the Tang Dynasty (d. 779)
- Fujiwara no Tsuginawa, Japanese statesman (d. 796)
- Liu Peng, general of the Tang Dynasty (d. 785)
- Sakanoue no Karitamaro, Japanese general (d. 786)
- Yang Yan, chancellor of the Tang Dynasty (d. 781)

728

- Abu Ubaidah, Muslim scholar of Arabic philology (d. 825)
- Du Huangchang, chancellor of the Tang Dynasty (or 729)

729

- Abu Yusuf, Arab jurist and chief adviser (approximate date; d. 798)
- Du Huangchang, chancellor of the Tang Dynasty (or 728)
- Li Huaiguang, general of the Tang Dynasty (d. 785)

== Deaths ==
720

- Ardo, king of the Visigoths (or 721)
- Aubert of Avranches, Frankish bishop
- Fujiwara no Fuhito, Japanese statesman (b. 659)
- Muhammad ibn Marwan, Muslim general (or 719)
- Odile of Alsace, Frankish abbess (approximate date)
- Tariq ibn Ziyad, Muslim general (b. 670)
- Umar II, Muslim caliph (b. 682)
- Xue Ne, general of the Tang dynasty (b. 649)
- Yazid ibn al-Muhallab, Muslim governor (b. 672)
- Yeh Fa-shan, Daoist wonder-worker (b. 631)
- Jamila, Arabian qiyan-courtesan singer

721

- February 13 – Chilperic II, king of the Franks
- May 7 – John of Beverley, bishop of York
- December 29 – Genmei, empress of Japan (b. 660)
- Al-Samh ibn Malik al-Khawlani, Muslim general (approximate date)
- Ardo, king of the Visigoths (or 720)
- Eadfrith, bishop of Lindisfarne
- Headda, bishop of Lichfield (approximate date)
- Liu Zhiji, Chinese historian (b. 661)
- Tervel, ruler (khagan) of the Bulgarian Empire
- Yao Chong, chancellor of the Tang dynasty (b. 650)

722

- September 29 – Leudwinus, Frankish bishop
- Beli II, king of Strathclyde (approximate date)
- Fergal mac Máele Dúin, High King of Ireland
- Máel Ruba, Irish abbot (b. 642)
- Mujahid ibn Jabr, Muslim scholar

723

- October 3 – Elias I of Antioch, Syriac Orthodox Patriarch of Antioch.
- Adalbert, duke of Alsace
- Fachtna mac Folachtan, Irish abbot
- Ō no Yasumaro, Japanese nobleman

724

- January 26 – Yazid II, Muslim caliph (b. 687)
- Felix, archbishop of Ravenna
- Fogartach mac Néill, High King of Ireland
- Hababah, concubine singer of Caliph Yazid II.
- Rotrude of Treves, wife of Charles Martel
- Tonyukuk, military leader of the Göktürks (approximate date)

725

- April 23 – Wihtred, king of Kent
- Ealdbert, prince of Wessex
- Grimoald, duke of Bavaria
- Gwylog ap Beli, king of Powys
- Nothhelm, king of Sussex
- Ruben of Dairinis, Irish scholar

726

- October 22 – Itzamnaaj K'awiil, a Maya ruler of Dos Pilas
- Anbasa ibn Suhaym al-Kalbi, Muslim governor
- Marcello Tegalliano, doge of Venice
- Oda of Scotland, Christian saint (approximate date)
- Smbat VI, Armenian prince
- Tobias, bishop of Rochester

727

- April 18 – Agallianos Kontoskeles, Byzantine commander and rebel leader
- May 30 – Hubertus, bishop of Liège
- October 19 – Frithuswith or Frideswide, Anglo-Saxon princess and abbess
- Murchad mac Brain Mut, king of Leinster (Ireland)
- Paul, exarch of Ravenna
- Yi Xing, Chinese astronomer and mechanical engineer (b. 683)

728

- Domnall mac Cellaig, king of Connacht (Ireland)
- Dúnchad mac Murchado, king of Leinster (Ireland)
- Hasan al-Basri, Arab theologian
- Jarir ibn Atiyah, Arab poet and satirist

729

- May 9 – Osric, king of Northumbria
- Ecgberht of Ripon, bishop of Lindisfarne (b. 639)
- Nagaya, Japanese prince and politician (b. 684)
- Shen Quanqi, Chinese poet and official (b. 650)
