= 720 =

Calendar year

720 in various calendars
- Gregorian calendar: 720; DCCXX
- Ab urbe condita: 1473
- Armenian calendar: 169; ԹՎ ՃԿԹ
- Assyrian calendar: 5470
- Balinese saka calendar: 641–642
- Bengali calendar: 126–127
- Berber calendar: 1670
- Buddhist calendar: 1264
- Burmese calendar: 82
- Byzantine calendar: 6228–6229
- Chinese calendar: 己未年 (Earth Goat); 3417 or 3210 — to — 庚申年 (Metal Monkey); 3418 or 3211
- Coptic calendar: 436–437
- Discordian calendar: 1886
- Ethiopian calendar: 712–713
- Hebrew calendar: 4480–4481
- Hindu calendars
- Vikram Samvat: 776–777
- Shaka Samvat: 641–642
- Kali Yuga: 3820–3821
- Holocene calendar: 10720
- Iranian calendar: 98–99
- Islamic calendar: 101–102
- Japanese calendar: Yōrō 4 (養老４年)
- Javanese calendar: 613–614
- Julian calendar: 720; DCCXX
- Korean calendar: 3053
- Minguo calendar: 1192 before ROC 民前1192年
- Nanakshahi calendar: −748
- Seleucid era: 1031/1032 AG
- Thai solar calendar: 1262–1263
- Tibetan calendar: ས་མོ་ལུག་ལོ་ (female Earth-Sheep); 846 or 465 or −307 — to — ལྕགས་ཕོ་སྤྲེ་ལོ་ (male Iron-Monkey); 847 or 466 or −306

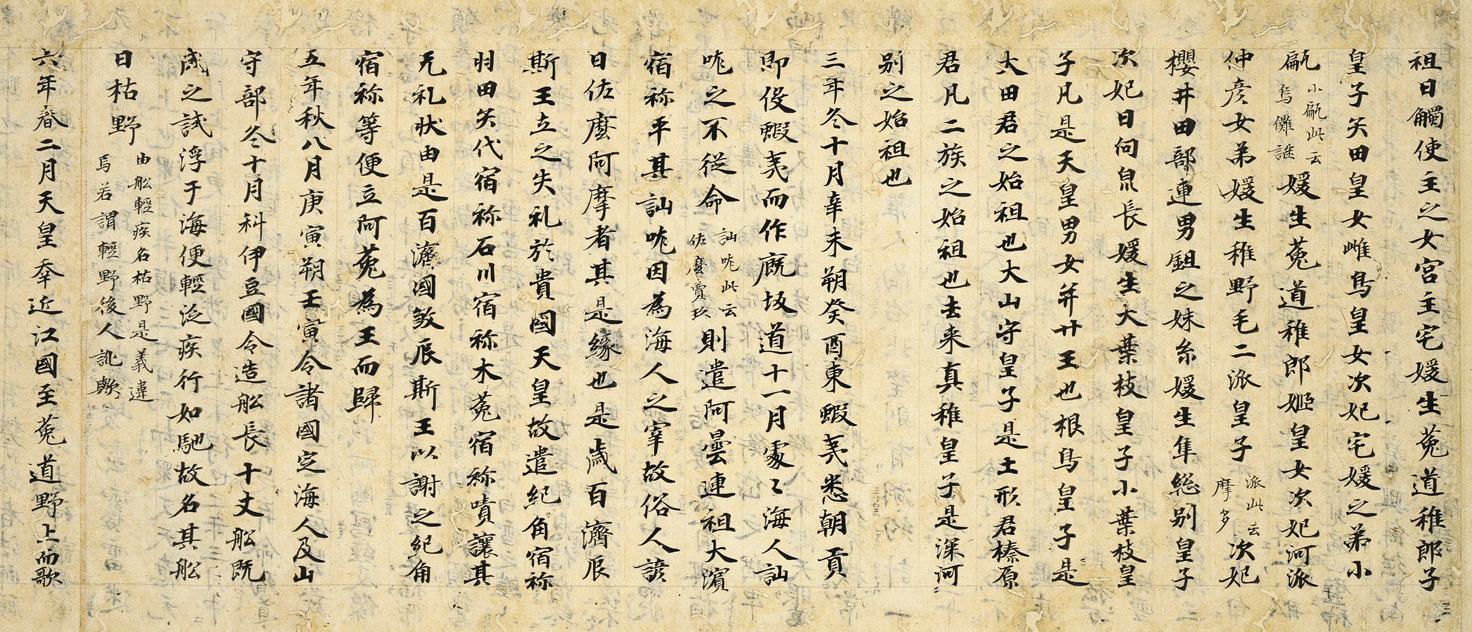
Page from a copy of the Nihon Shoki

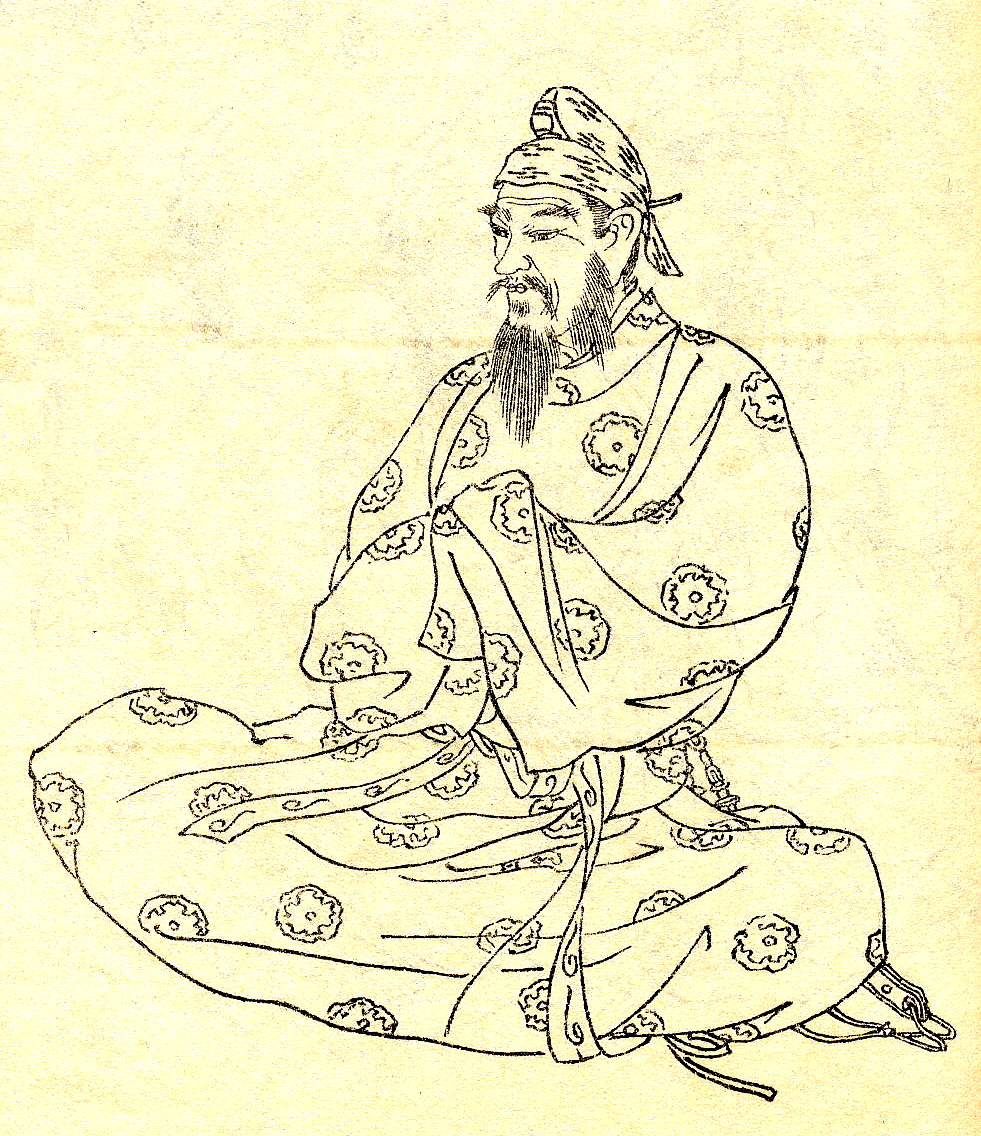
Fujiwara no Fuhito (659–720)

Year 720 (DCCXX) was a leap year starting on Monday of the Julian calendar. The denomination 720 for this year has been used since the early medieval period, when the Anno Domini calendar era became the prevalent method in Europe for naming years.

== Events ==
=== By place ===
==== Byzantine Empire ====
- Summer – Emperor Leo III secures the Byzantine frontier, by inviting Slavic settlers into the depopulated districts of the Thracesian Theme (western Asia Minor). He undertakes a set of civil reforms, and reorganizes the theme structure in the Aegean region. Leo's 2-year-old son Constantine V is associated on the throne, and married to Tzitzak, daughter of the Khazar ruler (khagan) Bihar.

==== Europe ====
- Umayyad conquest of Gaul: Governor Al-Samh continues his campaign; he makes Narbonne the capital city of Muslim Septimania (Southern France), and uses it as a base for razzias. King Ardo is killed, and becomes the last ruler of the Visigothic Kingdom of Hispania. Some Visigoths refuse to adopt the Muslim faith, and flee north to Aquitaine. This marks the end of the Visigothic Kingdom.
- Muslim forces under Al-Samh begin the prolonged siege of Carcassonne, a fortified Visigothic town located in the Languedoc-Roussillon.

==== Britain ====
- King Ine of Wessex builds a stone church at Glastonbury Abbey in Somerset (approximate date).

==== Egypt ====
- The Egyptians wage the Bashmurian revolts against the foreign Arab rulers. Egyptians establish a semi-independent region in the Nile Delta with Bashmur as the capital.

==== Arabian Empire ====
- Umayyad conquest of Transoxiana: The first Turgesh attack on Muslim-Arabs in Transoxiana leads to the siege and relief of the Umayyad garrison at the fortress of Qasr al-Bahili, near Samarkand (or 721).
- Yazid ibn al-Muhallab, former governor of Iraq, revolts and is defeated at Basra, by Umayyad forces under Al-Abbas ibn al-Walid and Maslama ibn Abd al-Malik. He is arrested and later executed.
- February 10 – Caliph Umar II is poisoned by a servant, and dies in Aleppo (Syria) after a 3-year reign. He is succeeded by his cousin Yazid II.
- The Umayyad Caliphate reaches its greatest extent in Spain, controlling all of it except a small region in the north controlled by the Kingdom of Asturias.

==== Asia ====
- In the Chinese capital of Chang'an, the walls of a gated city ward collapse during the night, which unexpectedly forms a large pool out in the open. This is most likely caused by a sinkhole created when ground water eroded the limestone bedrock beneath. As a consequence of this, more than 500 homes are destroyed (approximate date).

==== Americas ====
- The Third Tikal-Calakmul War begins.

=== By topic ===
==== Literature ====
- The Nihon Shoki (日本書紀), one of the oldest history books in Japan, is completed under the editorial supervision of Prince Toneri, and with the assistance of Ō no Yasumaro.

==== Religion ====
- Contact between the Welsh Church and Yvi of Brittany is the last known link between two Celtic countries. After this, each nation goes its own separate way (approximate date).

==== Astronomy ====
- A second series of gravitational interactions with Saturn, the second since 1664 BC, once again force the Centaur (minor planet) Chiron into a new orbit, shifting it from orbiting in the edges of the Solar System to orbiting near the inner regions.

== Births ==
- Baizhang Huaihai, Chinese Zen Buddhist monk (d. 814)
- Bernard, Frankish nobleman (approximate date)
- Bertrada of Laon, wife of Pippin the Short (d. 783)
- Modestus, Irish missionary (approximate date)
- Thierry IV, Frankish nobleman (approximate date)

== Deaths ==
- Ardo, king of the Visigoths (or 721)
- Aubert of Avranches, Frankish bishop
- Fujiwara no Fuhito, Japanese statesman (b. 659)
- Muhammad ibn Marwan, Muslim general (or 719)
- Odile of Alsace, Frankish abbess (approximate date)
- Tariq ibn Ziyad, Muslim general (b. 670)
- Umar II, Muslim caliph (b. 682)
- Xue Ne, general of the Tang dynasty (b. 649)
- Yazid ibn al-Muhallab, Muslim governor (b. 672)
- Yeh Fa-shan, Daoist wonder-worker (b. 631)
- Jamila, Arabian qiyan-courtesan singer
