= 729 =

Calendar year

729 in various calendars
Gregorian calendar	729; DCCXXIX
Ab urbe condita	1482
Armenian calendar	178; ԹՎ ՃՀԸ
Assyrian calendar	5479
Balinese saka calendar	650–651
Bengali calendar	135–136
Berber calendar	1679
Buddhist calendar	1273
Burmese calendar	91
Byzantine calendar	6237–6238
Chinese calendar	戊辰年 (Earth Dragon); 3426 or 3219 — to — 己巳年 (Earth Snake); 3427 or 3220
Coptic calendar	445–446
Discordian calendar	1895
Ethiopian calendar	721–722
Hebrew calendar	4489–4490
- Hindu calendars
Vikram Samvat	785–786
Shaka Samvat	650–651
Kali Yuga	3829–3830
Holocene calendar	10729
Iranian calendar	107–108
Islamic calendar	110–111
Japanese calendar	Jinki 6 / Tenpyō 1 (天平元年)
Javanese calendar	622–623
Julian calendar	729; DCCXXIX
Korean calendar	3062
Minguo calendar	1183 before ROC 民前1183年
Nanakshahi calendar	−739
Seleucid era	1040/1041 AG
Thai solar calendar	1271–1272
Tibetan calendar	ས་ཕོ་འབྲུག་ལོ་ (male Earth-Dragon); 855 or 474 or −298 — to — ས་མོ་སྦྲུལ་ལོ་ (female Earth-Snake); 856 or 475 or −297

Year 729 (DCCXXIX) was a common year starting on Saturday of the Julian calendar, the 729th year of the Common Era (CE) and Anno Domini (AD) designations, the 729th year of the 1st millennium, the 29th year of the 8th century, and the 10th and last year of the 720s decade. The denomination 729 for this year has been used since the early medieval period, when the Anno Domini calendar era became the prevalent method in Europe for naming years.

== Events ==
=== By place ===
==== Europe ====
- Battle of Ravenna: Byzantine troops under Eutychius, exarch of Ravenna, are defeated by an Italian force, raised by Gregory II, in opposition to iconoclasm.
- An alliance between Duke Eudes of Aquitaine and Munuza, the Moorish governor of Cerdanya, is cemented by marriage to Eudes' illegitimate daughter Lampégia.
- In Denmark, construction of the Kanhave Canal across the island of Samsø is completed. Although the canal is only about 500 metres long, it is one of the largest engineering projects undertaken in Denmark during the Early Middle Ages.

==== Britain ====
- King Osric of Northumbria nominates Ceolwulf, a distant cousin and brother of Coenred, as his successor. After Osric's death, Ceolwulf takes the throne.

==== Asia ====
- Battle of Baykand: The Umayyad Arabs narrowly escape disaster when cut off from water by the Turgesh, and push through to reach Bukhara in Transoxiana.
- Siege of Kamarja: A small Arab garrison defends the fortress of Kamarja against the Turgesh for 58 days, ending with a negotiated withdrawal to Samarkand.

=== By topic ===
==== Food and drink ====
- Chinese eating sticks are introduced in the next 20 years in Japan, where people heretofore have used one-piece pincers. The Japanese call them hashi.

== Births ==
- Abu Yusuf, Arab jurist and chief adviser (approximate date; d. 798)
- Du Huangchang, chancellor of the Tang Dynasty (or 728)
- Li Huaiguang, general of the Tang Dynasty (d. 785)

== Deaths ==
- May 9 – Osric, king of Northumbria
- Ecgberht of Ripon, bishop of Lindisfarne (b. 639)
- Nagaya, Japanese prince and politician (b. 684)
- Shen Quanqi, Chinese poet and official (b. 650)
