= 722 =

Calendar year

722 in various calendars
Gregorian calendar	722; DCCXXII
Ab urbe condita	1475
Armenian calendar	171; ԹՎ ՃՀԱ
Assyrian calendar	5472
Balinese saka calendar	643–644
Bengali calendar	128–129
Berber calendar	1672
Buddhist calendar	1266
Burmese calendar	84
Byzantine calendar	6230–6231
Chinese calendar	辛酉年 (Metal Rooster); 3419 or 3212 — to — 壬戌年 (Water Dog); 3420 or 3213
Coptic calendar	438–439
Discordian calendar	1888
Ethiopian calendar	714–715
Hebrew calendar	4482–4483
- Hindu calendars
Vikram Samvat	778–779
Shaka Samvat	643–644
Kali Yuga	3822–3823
Holocene calendar	10722
Iranian calendar	100–101
Islamic calendar	103–104
Japanese calendar	Yōrō 6 (養老６年)
Javanese calendar	615–616
Julian calendar	722; DCCXXII
Korean calendar	3055
Minguo calendar	1190 before ROC 民前1190年
Nanakshahi calendar	−746
Seleucid era	1033/1034 AG
Thai solar calendar	1264–1265
Tibetan calendar	ལྕགས་མོ་བྱ་ལོ་ (female Iron-Bird); 848 or 467 or −305 — to — ཆུ་ཕོ་ཁྱི་ལོ་ (male Water-Dog); 849 or 468 or −304

Year 722 (DCCXXII) was a common year starting on Thursday of the Julian calendar. The denomination 722 for this year has been used since the early medieval period, when the Anno Domini calendar era became the prevalent method in Europe for naming years.

== Events ==
=== By place ===
==== Europe ====
- Summer – Battle of Covadonga: Visigothic nobleman Pelagius (Don Pelayo) defeats the Umayyad forces under Munuza, provincial governor of Asturias, at Picos de Europa (near Covadonga). This marks the beginning of the Reconquista, the Christian reconquest of the Iberian Peninsula. He founds the Kingdom of Asturias, and establishes a military base at Cangas de Onís (northwest of Spain) (or 718).

==== Britain ====
- King Ine of Wessex attempts a takeover of Dumnonia, but his armies are crushed, and he is forced to withdraw. Queen Æthelburg, wife of Ine, destroys the royal castle of Taunton, to prevent its seizure by rebels under Ealdbert.
- The Battle of Allen is fought close by the Hill of Allen (Ireland) between the Laigin, led by King Murchad mac Brain Mut, and the forces of Fergal mac Máele Dúin (High King of Ireland).
- Battle of Hehil: The West Saxons are defeated by a combined Viking and Cornish army, at Cornovii in Cornwall (approximate date).

==== Mesoamerica ====
- January 3 – King Kʼinich Ahkal Moʼ Nahb III takes the throne of the Maya city-state of Palenque (southern Mexico).

=== By topic ===
==== Religion ====
- November 30 – Wessex-born Boniface is ordained as bishop of Germany by Pope Gregory II. Under the protection of Charles Martel (mayor of the palace), he concentrates his religious work in Hessia and Thuringia.
- Emperor Leo III enforces the baptism of all Jews and Montanists in the Byzantine Empire.

== Births ==
- Fruela I, king of Asturias (approximate date)
- Isma'il ibn Ja'far, Shī‘ah Imām and scholar (or 719)

== Deaths ==
- September 29 – Leudwinus, Frankish bishop
- Beli II, king of Strathclyde (approximate date)
- Fergal mac Máele Dúin, High King of Ireland
- Máel Ruba, Irish abbot (b. 642)
- Mujahid ibn Jabr, Muslim scholar
