= 594 =

Calendar year

594 in various calendars
- Gregorian calendar: 594; DXCIV
- Ab urbe condita: 1347
- Armenian calendar: 43; ԹՎ ԽԳ
- Assyrian calendar: 5344
- Balinese saka calendar: 515–516
- Bengali calendar: 0–1
- Berber calendar: 1544
- Buddhist calendar: 1138
- Burmese calendar: −44
- Byzantine calendar: 6102–6103
- Chinese calendar: 癸丑年 (Water Ox); 3291 or 3084 — to — 甲寅年 (Wood Tiger); 3292 or 3085
- Coptic calendar: 310–311
- Discordian calendar: 1760
- Ethiopian calendar: 586–587
- Hebrew calendar: 4354–4355
- Hindu calendars
- Vikram Samvat: 650–651
- Shaka Samvat: 515–516
- Kali Yuga: 3694–3695
- Holocene calendar: 10594
- Iranian calendar: 28 BP – 27 BP
- Islamic calendar: 29 BH – 28 BH
- Javanese calendar: 483–484
- Julian calendar: 594; DXCIV
- Korean calendar: 2927
- Minguo calendar: 1318 before ROC 民前1318年
- Nanakshahi calendar: −874
- Seleucid era: 905/906 AG
- Thai solar calendar: 1136–1137
- Tibetan calendar: ཆུ་མོ་གླང་ལོ་ (female Water-Ox); 720 or 339 or −433 — to — ཤིང་ཕོ་སྟག་ལོ་ (male Wood-Tiger); 721 or 340 or −432

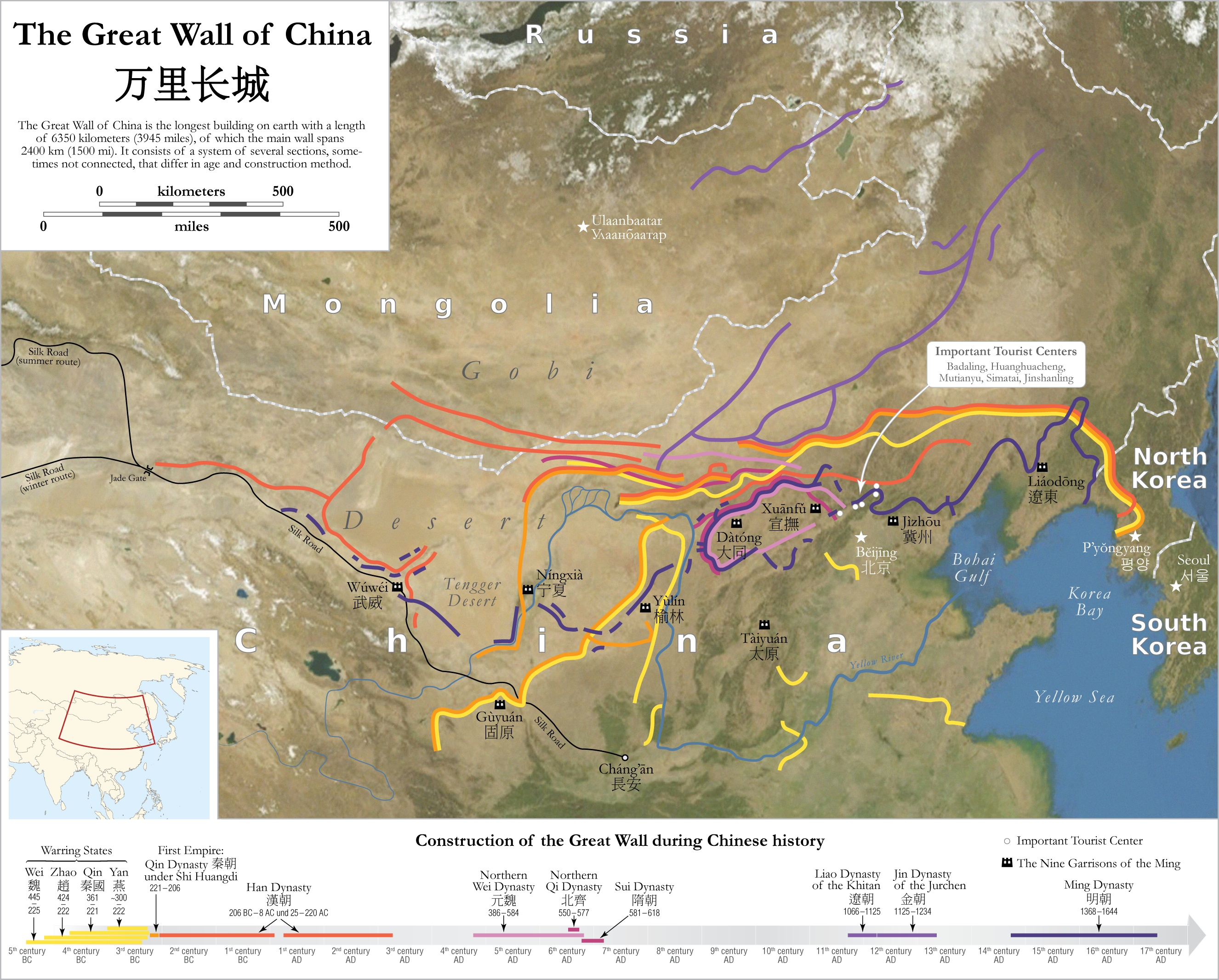
Constructions of the Great Wall (Sui dynasty)

Year 594 (DXCIV) was a common year starting on Friday of the Julian calendar. The denomination 594 for this year has been used since the early medieval period, when the Anno Domini calendar era became the prevalent method in Europe for naming years.

== Events ==
=== By place ===
==== Byzantine Empire ====
- Balkan Campaign: The Slavs invade the Byzantine provinces of Moesia and Macedonia again; during their pillaging the towns of Aquis, Scupi and Zaldapa in Dobruja are destroyed.
- Autumn – Emperor Maurice replaces general Priscus for disobeying orders. He installs his inexperienced brother Peter, as commander-in-chief in charge of the war against the Avars.

==== Asia ====
- Emperor Wéndi repairs and expands sections of the Great Wall in the north-west, which is undertaken by using forced labour. During the years, thousands of civilians are killed.
- Empress Suiko issues the "Flourishing Three Treasures Edict", officially recognizing the practice of Buddhism in Japan. She begins diplomatic relations with the Sui dynasty (China).

=== By topic ===
==== Religion ====
- Amos succeeds John IV as Orthodox Patriarch of Jerusalem.
- Approximate date – Pope Gregory I publishes his Dialogues.

== Births ==
- Kōgyoku, empress of Japan (d. 661)
- Li Shiji, general and chancellor of the Tang dynasty (d. 669)
- Zubayr ibn al-Awwam, companion of Muhammad (d. 656)

approximate date

- Ali ibn Abi Talib born(13 rajab), first Shia Imam (d. 661)
- Maymuna bint al-Harith, wife of Muhammad
- Ramla bint Abi Sufyan, wife of Muhammad

== Deaths ==
- November 17 – Gregory of Tours, bishop and historian
- John IV, patriarch of Jerusalem (approximate date)
