= 721 =

Calendar year

721 in various calendars
| Gregorian calendar | 721; DCCXXI |
| Ab urbe condita | 1474 |
| Armenian calendar | 170; ԹՎ ՃՀ |
| Assyrian calendar | 5471 |
| Balinese saka calendar | 642–643 |
| Bengali calendar | 127–128 |
| Berber calendar | 1671 |
| Buddhist calendar | 1265 |
| Burmese calendar | 83 |
| Byzantine calendar | 6229–6230 |
| Chinese calendar | 庚申年 (Metal Monkey); 3418 or 3211 — to — 辛酉年 (Metal Rooster); 3419 or 3212 |
| Coptic calendar | 437–438 |
| Discordian calendar | 1887 |
| Ethiopian calendar | 713–714 |
| Hebrew calendar | 4481–4482 |
- Hindu calendars
| Vikram Samvat | 777–778 |
| Shaka Samvat | 642–643 |
| Kali Yuga | 3821–3822 |
| Holocene calendar | 10721 |
| Iranian calendar | 99–100 |
| Islamic calendar | 102–103 |
| Japanese calendar | Yōrō 5 (養老５年) |
| Javanese calendar | 614–615 |
| Julian calendar | 721; DCCXXI |
| Korean calendar | 3054 |
| Minguo calendar | 1191 before ROC 民前1191年 |
| Nanakshahi calendar | −747 |
| Seleucid era | 1032/1033 AG |
| Thai solar calendar | 1263–1264 |
| Tibetan calendar | ལྕགས་ཕོ་སྤྲེ་ལོ་ (male Iron-Monkey); 847 or 466 or −306 — to — ལྕགས་མོ་བྱ་ལོ་ (female Iron-Bird); 848 or 467 or −305 |

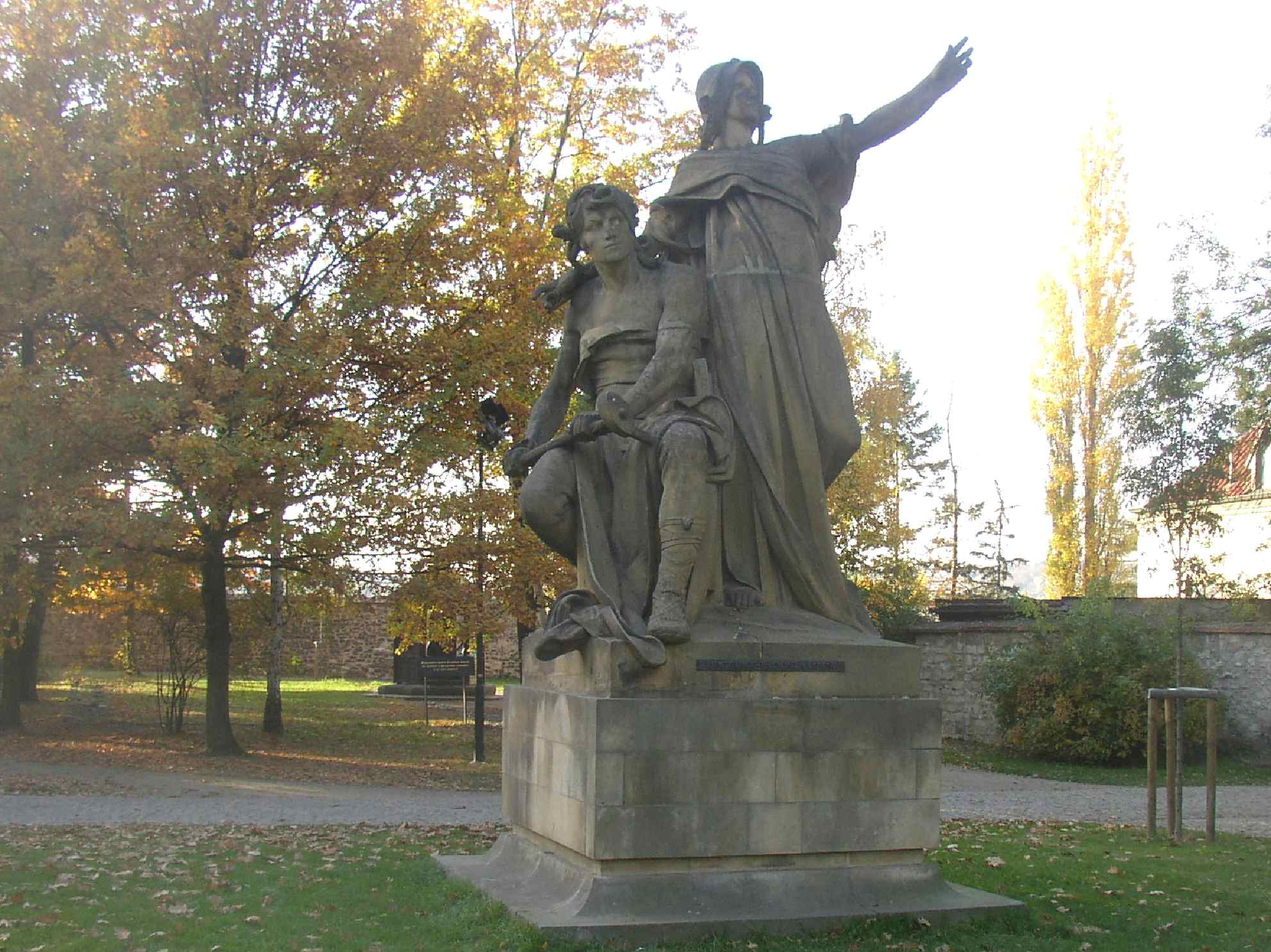
Přemysl and Libuše statue (Vyšehrad)

Year 721 (DCCXXI) was a common year starting on Wednesday of the Julian calendar. The denomination 721 for this year has been used since the early medieval period, when the Anno Domini calendar era became the prevalent method in Europe for naming years.

== Events ==
=== By place ===
==== Europe ====
- February 13 – King Chilperic II dies at Attigny (Ardennes), after a five-year reign. He is succeeded by Theuderic IV, infant son of Dagobert III, as Merovingian ruler of the Franks, under the control of the mayor of the palace, Charles Martel.
- Summer – Charles Martel restores the authority of the Austrasian palace throughout the Frankish Kingdom, including against Frankish-claimed Aquitaine and Provence (Southern France). He exiles Rigobert, bishop of Reims, to Gascony.
- June 9 – Battle of Toulouse: After besieging Toulouse for three months, Muslim forces under governor (wali) Al-Samh ibn Malik al-Khawlani are defeated by Eudes, duke of Aquitaine, preventing the extension of Umayyad control over Gaul.
- Anbasa ibn Suhaym Al-Kalbi is appointed governor of Al-Andalus, after the death of Al-Samh. The Muslims under Abdul Rahman al-Ghafiqi withdraw to Narbonne. The Visigothic duke Amrus of the Lerida area recognises Umayyad rule.
- Tervel, ruler (khagan) of the Bulgarian Empire, dies after a 21-year reign. He is succeeded by Kormesiy, possibly a son of Tervel, who is co-ruler and a descendant of the royal Dulo clan.
- Prague is founded (according to legend) by Princess Libuše and her husband Přemysl, founder of the Přemyslid dynasty (approximate date).

==== Britain ====
- King Ine of Wessex defeats Prince Cynewulf, an unknown relation making a push for the throne of Wessex.

==== Central America ====
- May 31 – Wak Chanil Ajaw (Lady Six Sky), who had been the regent for her son Kʼakʼ Tiliw Chan Chaak from 693 until his attainment of majority, becomes the new queen of the Mayan city state of Naranjo in Guatemala when K'ak Tiliw dies from unknown causes. She reigns until her death in 741.

==== China ====
- Rains and heavy storms around the southern seaport of Yangzhou destroy over 1,000 ships and boats in the Grand Canal, during the Tang dynasty (approximate date).

=== By topic ===
==== Religion ====
- Prüm Abbey is founded by Bertrada, daughter of former king Theuderic III, and her son Charibert, count of Laon (approximate date).

== Births ==
- Abul Abbas al-Saffah, Muslim caliph (approximate date)
- Fujiwara no Uona, Japanese minister (d. 783)
- Jābir ibn Hayyān, Muslim alchemist (approximate date)
- Tachibana no Naramaro, Japanese statesman (d. 757)

== Deaths ==
- February 13 – Chilperic II, king of the Franks
- May 7 – John of Beverley, bishop of York
- December 29 – Genmei, empress of Japan (b. 660)
- Al-Samh ibn Malik al-Khawlani, Muslim general (approximate date)
- Ardo, king of the Visigoths (or 720)
- Eadfrith, bishop of Lindisfarne
- Headda, bishop of Lichfield (approximate date)
- Liu Zhiji, Chinese historian (b. 661)
- Tervel, ruler (khagan) of the Bulgarian Empire
- Yao Chong, chancellor of the Tang dynasty (b. 650)
