= Cuthred of Wessex =

King of Wessex from 740 to 756

Cuthred

King of Wessex
- Reign: 740–756
- Predecessor: Æthelheard
- Successor: Sigeberht
- Died: 756
- House: Wessex

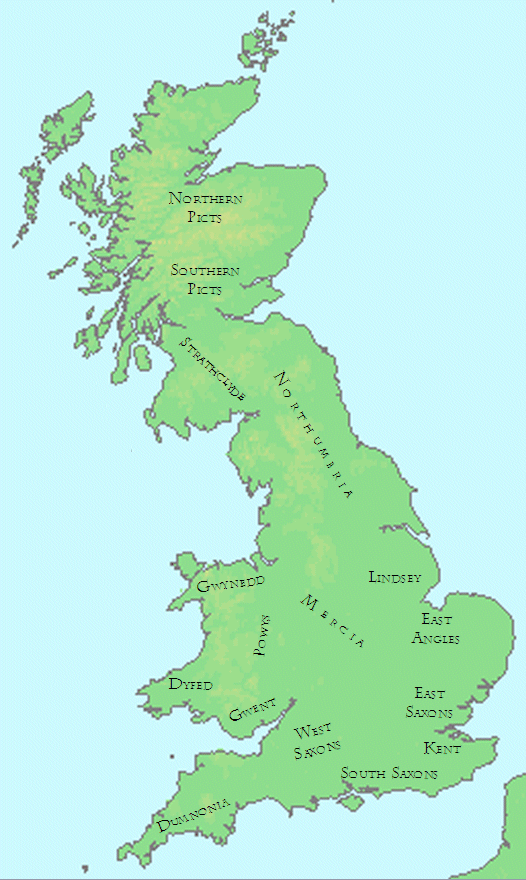

Cuthred or Cuþræd (died 756) was the King of Wessex from 740 (739 according to Simeon of Durham, 741 according to John of Worcester) until 756. He succeeded Æthelheard, his relative and possibly his brother.

Cuthred inherited the kingdom while Mercia was at its peak. The two kingdoms often fought in Cuthred's first three years, but it appears that Æthelbald of Mercia was Wessex's overlord and that Æthelbald compelled Cuthred to join him in fighting the Welsh in 743. This alliance would not last long.

Cuthred's reign was a troubled time. In 748, the Ætheling Cynric, son of Cuthred, attempted to depose his father but he was killed. According to the Anglo-Saxon Chronicle, Æthelbald may have encouraged Cynric to rebel.

In 750, the ealdorman Æthelhun led an unsuccessful rebellion he was winning until he was severely injured.

In 752, Cuthred, assisted by the now faithful Æthelhun, led a successful rebellion against Æthelbald at Battle Edge in Burford and secured independence from Mercia for the rest of his reign. He is also said to have fought the Cornish in 753.

Cuthred died in 756, but he left a stronger and more independent Wessex. He was succeeded by Sigeberht, who is identified as his distant relative.

== See also ==
- House of Wessex family tree

Regnal titles
Preceded by Æthelheard	King of Wessex; 740–756	Succeeded by Sigeberht
