= 684 =

Calendar year

684 in various calendars
Gregorian calendar	684; DCLXXXIV
Ab urbe condita	1437
Armenian calendar	133; ԹՎ ՃԼԳ
Assyrian calendar	5434
Balinese saka calendar	605–606
Bengali calendar	90–91
Berber calendar	1634
Buddhist calendar	1228
Burmese calendar	46
Byzantine calendar	6192–6193
Chinese calendar	癸未年 (Water Goat); 3381 or 3174 — to — 甲申年 (Wood Monkey); 3382 or 3175
Coptic calendar	400–401
Discordian calendar	1850
Ethiopian calendar	676–677
Hebrew calendar	4444–4445
- Hindu calendars
Vikram Samvat	740–741
Shaka Samvat	605–606
Kali Yuga	3784–3785
Holocene calendar	10684
Iranian calendar	62–63
Islamic calendar	64–65
Japanese calendar	Hakuchi 35 (白雉３５年)
Javanese calendar	576–577
Julian calendar	684; DCLXXXIV
Korean calendar	3017
Minguo calendar	1228 before ROC 民前1228年
Nanakshahi calendar	−784
Seleucid era	995/996 AG
Thai solar calendar	1226–1227
Tibetan calendar	ཆུ་མོ་ལུག་ལོ་ (female Water-Sheep); 810 or 429 or −343 — to — ཤིང་ཕོ་སྤྲེ་ལོ་ (male Wood-Monkey); 811 or 430 or −342

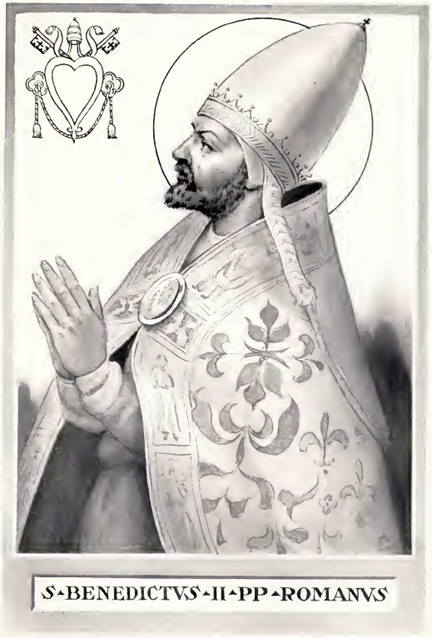
Pope Benedict II (684–685)

Year 684 (DCLXXXIV) was a leap year starting on Friday of the Julian calendar. The denomination 684 for this year has been used since the early medieval period, when the Anno Domini calendar era became the prevalent method in Europe for naming years.

== Events ==
=== By place ===
==== Europe ====
- Ghislemar, mayor of the palace in Neustria and Burgundy, dies after a 2-year reign, and is succeeded by his father Waratto. He makes peace between the three Frankish kingdoms.

==== Britain ====
- King Ecgfrith of Northumbria sends a punitive expedition to Ireland under his ealdorman Berht, laying waste to the territory of Meath, ruled by High King Fínsnechta Fledach.

==== Arabian Empire ====
- Caliph Mu'awiya II dies at Damascus, after a brief reign that ends Sufyanid rule. A new caliph is proclaimed in Syria amidst tribal wars, but Marwan I will reign until next year.
- August 18 – Battle of Marj Rahit: Muslim partisans under Marwan I defeat the supporters of Abd Allah ibn al-Zubayr near Damascus, and cement Umayyad control of Syria.

==== Asia ====
- January 3 – Zhong Zong succeeds his father Gao Zong, and becomes emperor of the Tang dynasty. His mother Wu Zetian remains the power behind the throne in China.
- February 27 – Wu Zetian replaces Zhong Zong in favor of his younger brother Rui Zong. He becomes a puppet ruler, and Zhong Zong is placed under house arrest.
- Summer – The Pallava Empire (modern India) invades the kingdom of Ceylon. A Pallavan naval expedition employing Tamil mercenaries ends the Moriya dynasty.

===== Japan =====
- September 7 – A large comet is observed in Japan (it's Japan's oldest observation record of Halley's Comet).
- November 13 – Emperor Tenmu institutes eight titles of eight classes (Yakusa-no-kabane) in Japan.
- November 26 – 684 Hakuho earthquake. A great earthquake strikes Japan. The people, houses, temples, shrines and domestic animals are greatly damaged.

==== Mesoamerica ====
- February 10 – Kʼinich Kan Bahlam II accedes to the rulership of the Maya polity of Palenque (modern Mexico).

=== By topic ===
==== Religion ====
- Cuthbert is elected Bishop of Hexham, and receives a visit from a large group under Ecgfrith. He agrees to return to Lindisfarne (Northumbria) to take up duties.
- June 26 – Pope Benedict II succeeds Leo II as the 81st pope of Rome, after a period of sede vacante ("vacant seat") of 1 year.

== Births ==
- Gao Lishi, official and eunuch of the Tang dynasty (d. 762)
- Li Guo'er, princess of the Tang dynasty (approximate date)
- Nagaya, Japanese prince and politician (d. 729)
- Tachibana no Moroe, Japanese prince and minister (d. 757)

== Deaths ==
- August 24 – Audoin, bishop of Rouen (b. 609)
- Adarnase II, king of Iberia (approximate date)
- Aldegund, Frankish Benedictine abbess
- Cædmon, Northumbrian poet (approximate date; b. ca. 657)
- Constantine of Mananali, founder of the Paulicians
- Ghislemar, mayor of the palace in Neustria and Burgundy
- Li Xian, prince of the Tang dynasty (b. 653)
- Luo Binwang, Chinese poet and official
- Mu'awiya II, Muslim caliph (b. 661)
- Pei Yan, chancellor of the Tang dynasty
- Philibert of Jumièges, Frankish abbot
- Severus II bar Masqeh, Syriac Orthodox Patriarch of Antioch.
