= 642 =

Calendar year

642 in various calendars
- Gregorian calendar: 642; DCXLII
- Ab urbe condita: 1395
- Armenian calendar: 91; ԹՎ ՂԱ
- Assyrian calendar: 5392
- Balinese saka calendar: 563–564
- Bengali calendar: 48–49
- Berber calendar: 1592
- Buddhist calendar: 1186
- Burmese calendar: 4
- Byzantine calendar: 6150–6151
- Chinese calendar: 辛丑年 (Metal Ox); 3339 or 3132 — to — 壬寅年 (Water Tiger); 3340 or 3133
- Coptic calendar: 358–359
- Discordian calendar: 1808
- Ethiopian calendar: 634–635
- Hebrew calendar: 4402–4403
- Hindu calendars
- Vikram Samvat: 698–699
- Shaka Samvat: 563–564
- Kali Yuga: 3742–3743
- Holocene calendar: 10642
- Iranian calendar: 20–21
- Islamic calendar: 21–22
- Japanese calendar: N/A
- Javanese calendar: 532–533
- Julian calendar: 642; DCXLII
- Korean calendar: 2975
- Minguo calendar: 1270 before ROC 民前1270年
- Nanakshahi calendar: −826
- Seleucid era: 953/954 AG
- Thai solar calendar: 1184–1185
- Tibetan calendar: ལྕགས་མོ་གླང་ལོ་ (female Iron-Ox); 768 or 387 or −385 — to — ཆུ་ཕོ་སྟག་ལོ་ (male Water-Tiger); 769 or 388 or −384

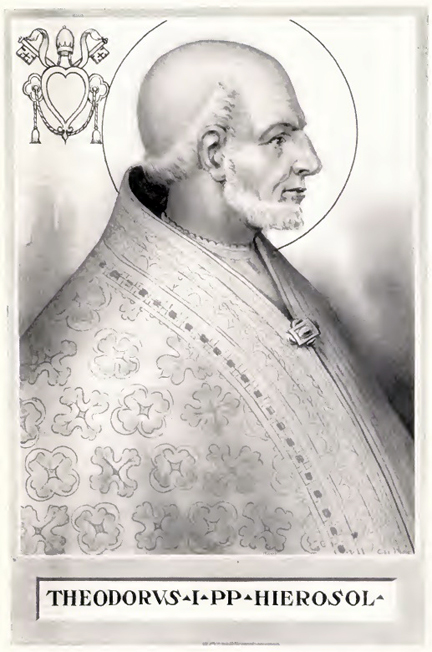
Pope Theodore I (642–649)

Year 642 (DCXLII) was a common year starting on Tuesday of the Julian calendar. The denomination 642 for this year has been used since the early medieval period, when the Anno Domini calendar era became the prevalent method in Europe for naming years.

== Events ==
=== By place ===
==== Byzantine Empire ====
- Emperor Constans II marries Fausta.

==== Europe ====
- April 30 – Chindasuinth, a Gothic warlord (already 79 years old), commences a rebellion and deposes King Tulga in Toledo, Spain. He is proclaimed king by the Visigothic nobility and anointed by the bishops. Tulga is tonsured and sent out to live his days in a monastery.
- Radulf, a Frankish aristocrat, revolts against King Sigebert III of Austrasia and defeats his army, taking the title of rex or king of Thuringia.

==== Britain ====
- August 5 – Battle of Maserfield: King Penda of Mercia defeats and kills King Oswald of Northumbria, age 38, at Oswestry (West Midlands). He commands a united British and Mercian force, which includes the Welsh army of Kings Cadafael Cadomedd of Gwynedd and Cynddylan of Pengwern. The Mercians become dominant in the English Midlands.
- Oswiu succeeds his half-brother Oswald as king of Bernicia. He strengthens his position by marrying Eanflæd, daughter of King Edwin of Northumbria, then in exile in the Kingdom of Kent. This marriage takes place between 642 and 644.

==== Persia ====
- Battle of Nahāvand: The Rashidun army (30,000 men) under Sa`d ibn Abi Waqqas defeats the Persians at Nahāvand (modern Iran). The Persian cavalry, full of confidence, mounts an ill-prepared attack. The Arabs retreat to a safe area, where they outmanoeuvre and destroy the Persians in a narrow mountain valley.

==== Africa ====
- Battle of Dongola: 'Amr ibn al-'As sends an Arab expedition of 20,000 horsemen, under his cousin Uqba ibn Nafi, to Makuria (Southern Egypt). The Nubians strike hard against the Muslims near Dongola with hit-and-run attacks. The Arab incursions into Nubia are temporarily halted.

==== Asia ====
- Emperor Taizong of the Tang dynasty issues a decree throughout China, that increases the punishment for men who deliberately inflict injuries upon themselves (most commonly breaking their own legs) in order to avoid military conscription. This decree is an effort to eradicate this practice that has grown as a trend since the time of the rebellion against the Sui dynasty.
- Taizong supports a revolt by Turkic tribes against the rebellious Tu-lu Qaghan of the Western Turkic Khaganate.
- Empress Kōgyoku ascends to the throne of Japan, after her husband (and uncle) Emperor Jomei's death in 641.
- Winter – Yŏn Kaesomun seizes power over Goguryeo (Korea), and places King Bojang on the throne.

=== By topic ===
==== Arts and sciences ====
- The earliest surviving dated Arabic-language papyrus (PERF 558), found in Heracleopolis (Egypt), and the earliest known Arabic text with diacritical marks is written.

==== Architecture ====
- Arabs begin construction of the Mosque of Amr at Cairo, the first mosque built in Egypt and in all of Africa.

==== Religion ====
- October 12 – Pope John IV dies after a 2-year reign. He is succeeded by a Jerusalem-born cleric of Greek descent, Theodore I, as the 73rd pope of Rome.
- A monastic settlement is founded in Hampshire (England) which later becomes Winchester Cathedral.

== Births ==
- Ceolfrith, Anglo-Saxon abbot (approximate date)
- Hasan al-Basri, Arab theologian (d. 728)
- Julian, archbishop of Toledo (d. 690)
- Máel Ruba, Irish abbot (d. 722)
- Mujahid ibn Jabr, Muslim scholar (or 645)

== Deaths ==
- March 21 – Cyrus of Alexandria, Patriarch of Alexandria and governor of Egypt
- August 5 or 641 – Oswald, king of Northumbria
- October 12 – Pope John IV
- Emma, Anglo-Saxon queen
- Eowa, king of Mercia (English Midlands)
- Domnall Brecc, king of Dál Riata
- Domnall mac Áedo, high king of Ireland
- Flaochad, Mayor of the Palace (Burgundy)
- Heraklonas, Byzantine emperor (approximate date)
- Khalid ibn al-Walid, Arab general (b. 592)
- Mardanshah, Persian general
- Nanthild, Frankish queen
- Pulakeshin II, king of Chalukya (India)
- Willibad, patrician (of duke) of Burgundy
- Yeongnyu, king of Goguryeo (Korea)
- Yuwen Shiji, chancellor of the Tang dynasty
