= Æthelheard of Wessex =

King of Wessex from 726 to 740

Æthelheard

King of Wessex
- Reign: 726–740
- Predecessor: Ine
- Successor: Cuthred
- Consort: Frithugyth
- House: Wessex

Æthelheard (meaning roughly "Noble Stern"), also spelled Ethelheard, Edelard or Æþelheard, was King of Wessex from 726 to 740. There is an unreliable record of Æthelheard having been the brother-in-law of his predecessor, Ine, but his ancestry is unknown, perhaps making him the first King of Wessex not to be descended from Cynric by blood.

Some sources identify him as the brother of Queen Æthelburg of Wessex, the wife of his predecessor, King Ine. His own successor Cuthred is identified in the Anglo-Saxon Chronicle as 'his relative'.

When Ine abdicated and went to Rome in 726, he left behind no obvious heir, and according to Bede simply left his kingdom "to younger men". The Anglo-Saxon Chronicle calls him a descendant of the early king Ceawlin.

Æthelheard married Frithugyth in 729 or before.

== See also ==
- House of Wessex family tree

Regnal titles
Preceded by Ine	King of Wessex; 726–740	Succeeded by Cuthred
