= Ui-te-Rangiora =

Maori navigator

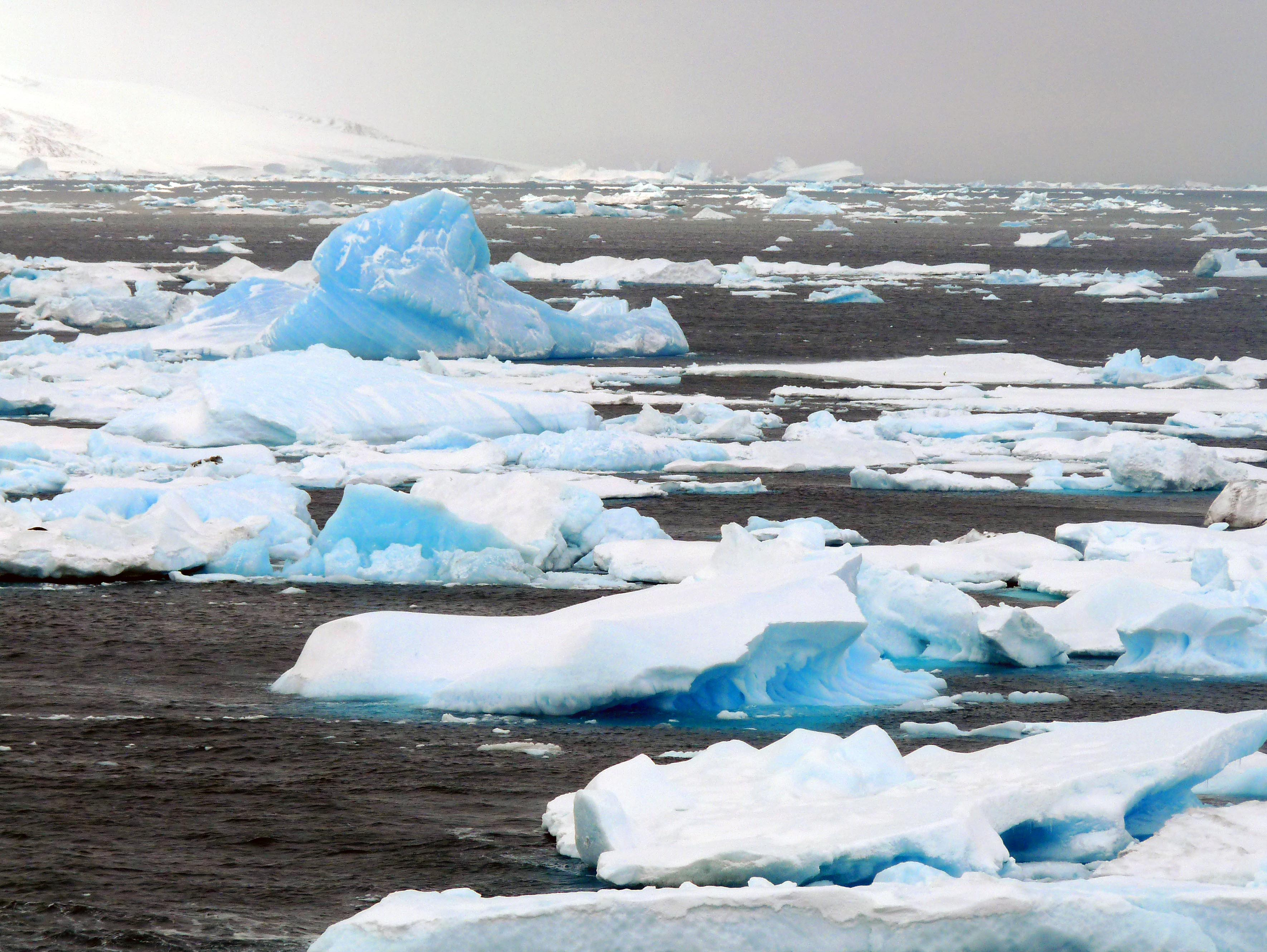
Ice floes in the Southern Ocean

Ui-te-Rangiora or Hui Te Rangiora is a legendary Polynesian navigator who sailed to the Southern Ocean and is sometimes claimed to have discovered Antarctica in the early seventh century on the vessel Te Ivi o Atea. The legend originates from the island of Rarotonga in the Cook Islands archipelago, but this island was not populated until the tenth century.

According to a 19th-century interpretation of Rarotongan legend by Stephenson Percy Smith, Ui-te-Rangiora and his crew on the vessel Te Ivi o Atea sailed south and encountered an area he called Tai-uka-a-pia, "sea foaming like arrowroot" (interpreted by Smith as a frozen sea), "a foggy, misty, and dark place not seen by the sun" where rocks grow out of the sea. Smith interpreted this as referring to the ice floes and icebergs in the Southern Ocean, due to the ice floes being similar to arrowroot powder (referring to Tacca leontopetaloides, Polynesian arrowroot). This has led others to conclude that Ui-te-Rangiora was the first person to discover Antarctica.

The interpretation of Ui-te-Rangiora reaching Antarctic waters has been questioned. Anderson et al. note that there is no mention of an Antarctic voyage in the original legend, and that it is first mentioned in the story of his descendant Te Aru Tanga Nuku, who wished to "behold all the wonderful things on the ocean" seen by his ancestor. Anthropologist Te Rangi Hīroa assessed the legend as having "so much post-European information" that it cannot be accepted as accurate and ancient. As the Cook Islands Māori language had no pre-European word for 'ice' or 'frozen', interpreting Tai-uka-a-pia as a frozen sea may be a mistranslation, and an alternate interpretation is "sea covered with foam like arrowroot". New Zealand iwi Ngāi Tahu considers the legend to be a mythic origin story rather than a historical voyaging narrative.

It has been suggested that the folklore of the islanders reflected an actual event, namely a sea area covered with a dense layer of floating pieces of pumice resulting from some undersea volcanic eruption. Such a 25 000 km^{2} sea surface was sighted in 2012 in the area of Kermadec Islands, with a 60 cm thick bright white layer resembling a shelf glacier.

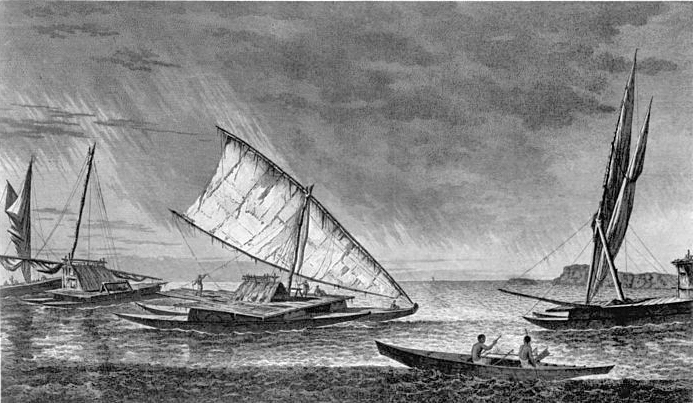
Tongan canoes, with sails and cabins, and two Tongan men paddling a smaller canoe from "Boats of the Friendly Isles" a record of Cook's visit to Tonga, 1773-4

== Subantarctic islands ==
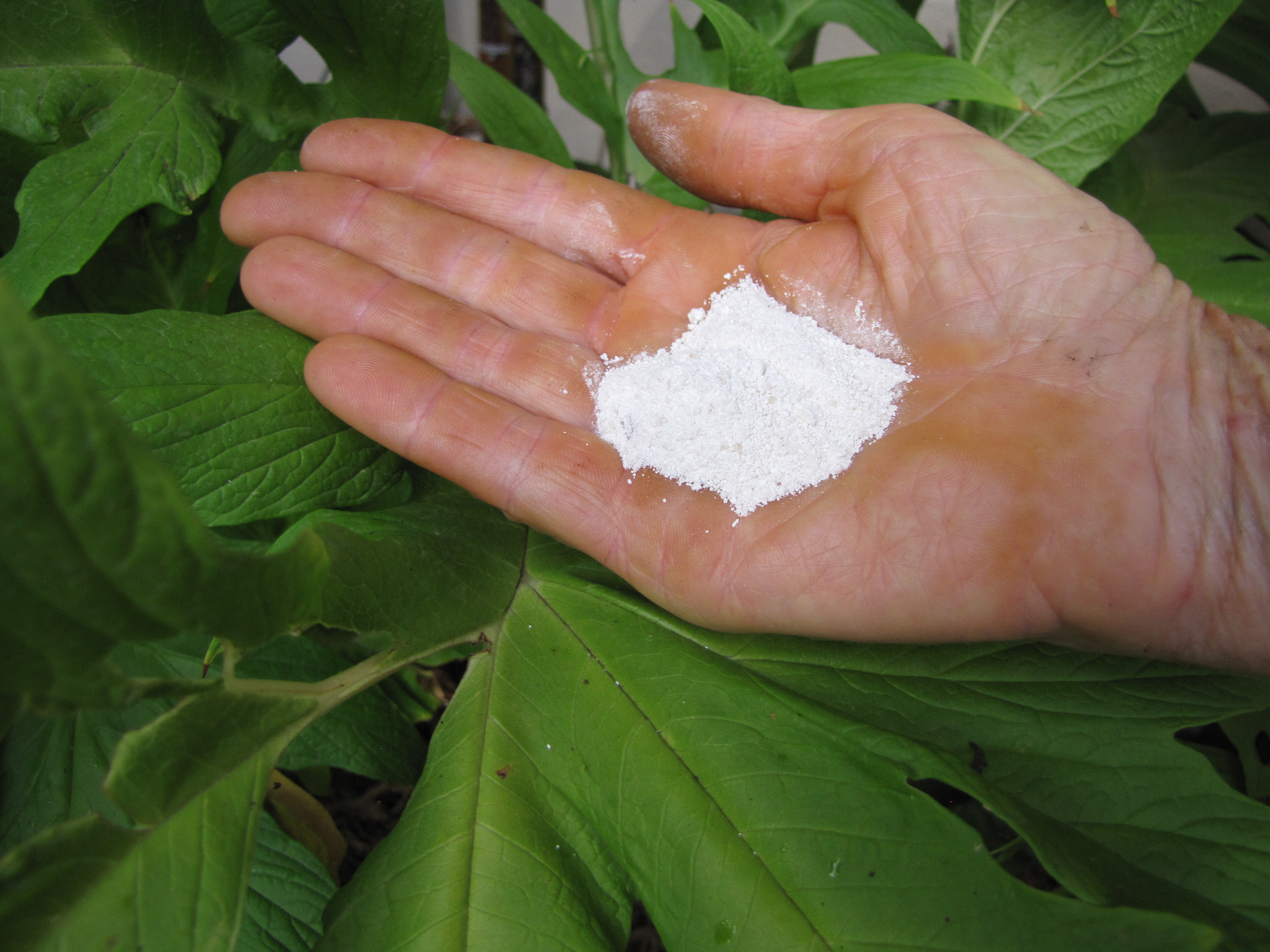
Powdered pia (Polynesian arrowroot), to which the ice floes were compared

It has been claimed that in 1886 Lapita pottery shards were discovered on the Antipodes Islands, indicating that Polynesians did reach that far south. However, the claim has not been substantiated; indeed, no archaeological evidence of human visitation prior to European discovery of the islands has been found.

Enderby Island, considerably south of the Antipodes Islands, has been found to have proof of 13th- or 14th-century Māori use. Similarly, a craft of 'ancient design' was found in 1810 on the subantarctic Macquarie Island, considerably south and west of the Auckland Islands. It has been suggested that the craft was burnt for fuel that year in the ensuing penguin and seal oil fires, and that it might have been a Polynesian vessel. In the same year, Captain Smith described in more detail what is presumably the same wreck: 'several pieces of wreck of a large vessel on this Island, apparently very old and high up in the grass, probably the remains of the ship of the unfortunate de Lapérouse.' However, de Lapérouse had wrecked in Vanikoro in the Solomon Islands in 1788.
