= 650 =

Calendar year

650 in various calendars
Gregorian calendar	650; DCL
Ab urbe condita	1403
Armenian calendar	99; ԹՎ ՂԹ
Assyrian calendar	5400
Balinese saka calendar	571–572
Bengali calendar	56–57
Berber calendar	1600
Buddhist calendar	1194
Burmese calendar	12
Byzantine calendar	6158–6159
Chinese calendar	己酉年 (Earth Rooster); 3347 or 3140 — to — 庚戌年 (Metal Dog); 3348 or 3141
Coptic calendar	366–367
Discordian calendar	1816
Ethiopian calendar	642–643
Hebrew calendar	4410–4411
- Hindu calendars
Vikram Samvat	706–707
Shaka Samvat	571–572
Kali Yuga	3750–3751
Holocene calendar	10650
Iranian calendar	28–29
Islamic calendar	29–30
Japanese calendar	Taika 6 / Hakuchi 1 (白雉元年)
Javanese calendar	541–542
Julian calendar	650; DCL
Korean calendar	2983
Minguo calendar	1262 before ROC 民前1262年
Nanakshahi calendar	−818
Seleucid era	961/962 AG
Thai solar calendar	1192–1193
Tibetan calendar	ས་མོ་བྱ་ལོ་ (female Earth-Bird); 776 or 395 or −377 — to — ལྕགས་ཕོ་ཁྱི་ལོ་ (male Iron-Dog); 777 or 396 or −376

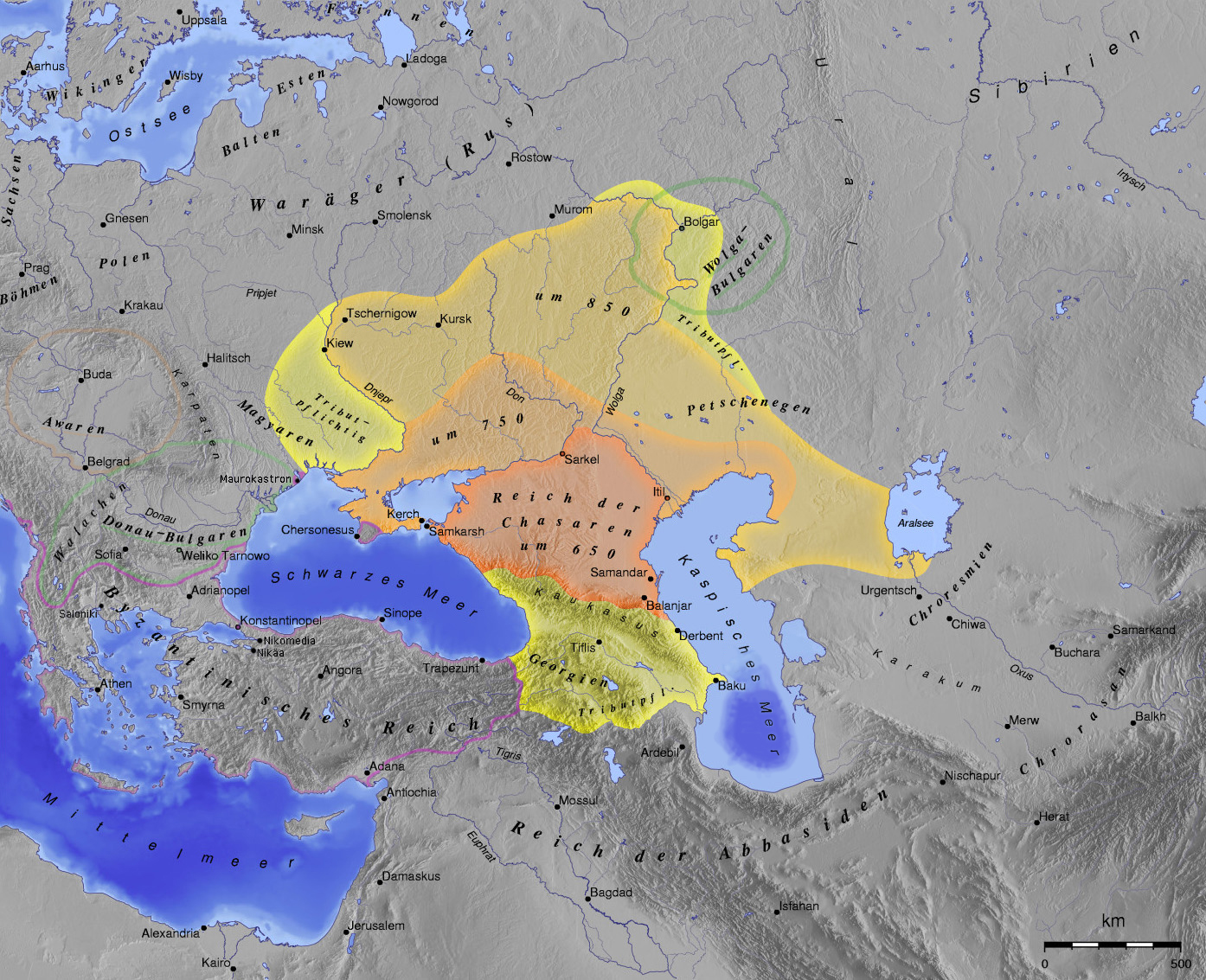
The Khazar Khaganate (650–850)

Year 650 (DCL) was a common year starting on Friday of the Julian calendar. The denomination 650 for this year has been used since the early medieval period, when the Anno Domini calendar era became the prevalent method in Europe for naming years.

== Events ==
=== By place ===
==== Europe ====
- The Khazar Khaganate extends from the Dnieper to the Caspian Sea, and establishes the city, Itil, as its capital on the shore of the Caspian. Northward it extends to the headwaters of the Volga. Their rulers accept the Jewish religion, apparently to assert their independence from both Muslims and Christians (approximate date).
- A Rashidun army under Abd al-Rahman ibn Rabi'a is annihilated by the Khazars, near the city of Balanjar (Northern Caucasus). During the battle, both sides use catapults against the other (approximate date).

==== Britain ====
- The Mercians under King Penda move on East Anglia, destroy the monastery at Burgh Castle and expel King Anna who probably flees to Magonsæte (approximate date).
- King Oswiu of Bernicia seeks Irish support against the forces of Penda. While in Ireland he has a liaison with Fín, the granddaughter of King Colmán Rímid Uí Néill (approximate date).
- King Cloten of Dyfed (Southern Wales) marries Princess Ceindrech of Brycheiniog, and unites the two kingdoms (approximate date).

==== Asia ====
- The first Chinese paper money is issued, yet these banknotes will not become government-issued until the Song dynasty era Sichuan province issues them in the year 1024, with the central government of China following suit in the 12th century.
- Emperor Kōtoku is presented a white pheasant; he is pleased and begins a new Japanese era name (nengō) to be called Hakuchi, meaning 'The White Pheasant'.

==== Americas ====
- Earliest confirmed date of habitation in the area around what is now Bluff, Utah by humans.
- Yuknoom Chʼeen II, ruler of Calakmul, attacks Dos Pilas and forces its leader, Bʼalaj Chan Kʼawiil, and a likely heir to the throne of Tikal, to take refuge at Aguateca, beginning the Second Tikal–Calakmul War.
- Jamaica is settled by the Ostinoid people, ancestors of the Taíno. They were farmers, potters, and villagers with socially complex societies. These people lived near the coast and extensively hunted turtles and fish.

==== Oceania ====
- According to legend, the Polynesian traveller Ui-te-Rangiora sailed south into the Southern Ocean where they sighted ice floes and icebergs, eventually naming the area Te tai-uka-a-pia.

=== By topic ===
==== Religion ====
- St. Martin's Church is built in Canterbury, England (approximate date).

==== Art and science ====
- The panel of the Tamamushi Shrine, the so called "Hungry Tigress Jataka", is made during the Asuka period (Japan). It is now kept at Horyu-ji Treasure House (approximate date).

== Births ==
- Anastasia, Byzantine empress (approximate date)
- Dagobert II, king of Austrasia (approximate date)
- Frithuswith, Anglo-Saxon abbess (approximate date)
- Giles, Frankish abbot (approximate date)
- Jarir ibn Atiyah, Arab poet and satirist (approximate date)
- Sergius I, pope of Rome (approximate date)
- Shen Quanqi, Chinese poet and official (approximate date)
- Werburgh, Anglo-Saxon princess (approximate date)
- Yao Chong, chancellor of the Tang dynasty (d. 721)

== Deaths ==
- Candrakīrti, Indian Madhyamaka philosopher (approximate date)
- Chen Yueyi, empress of Northern Zhou (approximate date)
- Ferchar mac Connaid, king of Dál Riata (modern Scotland)
- Fursey, Irish missionary (approximate date)
