= AD 757 =

757 in various calendars
- Gregorian calendar: 757; DCCLVII
- Ab urbe condita: 1510
- Armenian calendar: 206; ԹՎ ՄԶ
- Assyrian calendar: 5507
- Balinese saka calendar: 678–679
- Bengali calendar: 163–164
- Berber calendar: 1707
- Buddhist calendar: 1301
- Burmese calendar: 119
- Byzantine calendar: 6265–6266
- Chinese calendar: 丙申年 (Fire Monkey); 3454 or 3247 — to — 丁酉年 (Fire Rooster); 3455 or 3248
- Coptic calendar: 473–474
- Discordian calendar: 1923
- Ethiopian calendar: 749–750
- Hebrew calendar: 4517–4518
- Hindu calendars
- Vikram Samvat: 813–814
- Shaka Samvat: 678–679
- Kali Yuga: 3857–3858
- Holocene calendar: 10757
- Iranian calendar: 135–136
- Islamic calendar: 139–140
- Japanese calendar: Tenpyō-shōhō 9 / Tenpyō-hōji 1 (天平宝字元年)
- Javanese calendar: 651–652
- Julian calendar: 757; DCCLVII
- Korean calendar: 3090
- Minguo calendar: 1155 before ROC 民前1155年
- Nanakshahi calendar: −711
- Seleucid era: 1068/1069 AG
- Thai solar calendar: 1299–1300
- Tibetan calendar: མེ་ཕོ་སྤྲེ་ལོ་ (male Fire-Monkey); 883 or 502 or −270 — to — མེ་མོ་བྱ་ལོ་ (female Fire-Bird); 884 or 503 or −269

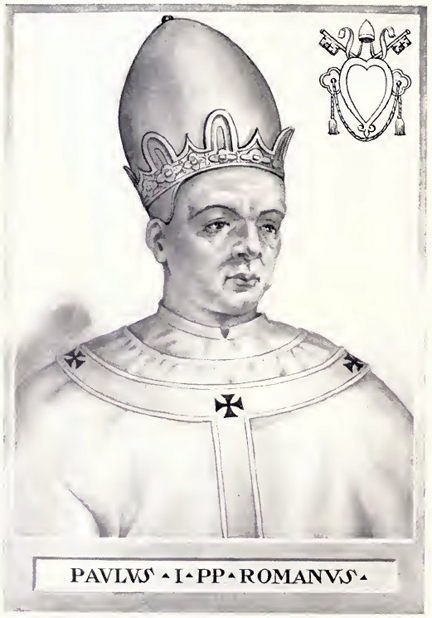
Pope Paul I (757–767)

Year 757 (DCCLVII) was a common year starting on Saturday of the Julian calendar. The denomination 757 for this year has been used since the early medieval period, when the Anno Domini calendar era became the prevalent method in Europe for naming years.

== Events ==
=== By place ===
==== Europe ====
- Tassilo III, duke of Bavaria, recognizes the supremacy of King Pepin III ("the Short") at an assembly held at Compiègne (Northern France), and becomes a vassal of the Frankish Kingdom. He swears an oath (commendatio) to Pepin, and promises his allegiance.
- King Alfonso I ("the Catholic") dies at Cangas (modern Spain), after an 18-year reign. He is succeeded by his son Fruela I as ruler of Asturias.

==== Britain ====
- King Æthelbald of Mercia is murdered by his own household in a palace coup. He is succeeded briefly by Beornred, but he is, in turn, ousted by Æthelbald's distant cousin, Offa. In the meantime, Mercian supremacy over Southern England is lost.
- King Sigeberht of Wessex acts unjustly and is removed from power by a council of nobles, in favor of Cynewulf. Sigeberht is given control of Hampshire, probably as ealdorman, but he murders one of his own men and is driven out.

==== Africa ====
- The city of Sijilmasa (modern Morocco) is founded by the Miknasa, a Zenata Berber tribe. They adopt Kharijism-Islam, and establish the Emirate of Sijilmasa in the northern Sahara. It becomes a wealthy trading center as the western end-point of the Trans-Saharan trade.
- The Warfajuma Berbers and their Sufrite allies sweep up from southern Tunisia and capture Kairouan, killing Emir Habib Al-Fihri and putting an end to the Fihrid dynasty. In the meantime, the Ibadites that Ibn Habib had driven out of Tripoli return, rallied by their imam Abu al-Khattab al-Ma'afiri in Jebel Nefusa, the Ibadites recapture Tripoli.

=== Middle East ===
- Ibn al-Muqaffa,a Persian translator, philosopher was arrested, brutally dismembered, and executed on the orders of the Abbasid Caliph Al-Mansur at Basra (modern Iraq).His limbs are severed and he is thrown, still alive, into a burning oven but later died in severe torture.Though politically motivated by internal court rivalries, his execution was officially sanctioned under the accusation of zandaqa (heresy/atheism) and blasphemy.

==== China ====
- January 29 – An Lushan, leader of a revolt and emperor of Yan, is murdered by his own son An Qingxu at Luoyang. He succeeds his father, and appoints Shi Siming as his deputy. The military leaders of the Tang Dynasty are able to retake both of the capitals at Chang'an and at Luoyang. The rebel army is forced to retreat east.
- Battle of Suiyang: A Tang garrison (7,000 men) under Zhang Xun defend their fortress against the rebel army at Suiyang. Zhang makes multiple attempts to get food from nearby fortresses, but this is refused. After a desperate 10-month siege, Suiyang is overrun by rebel forces who take the city. Because of famine an estimated 20,000 to 30,000 citizens are cannibalized, only 400 people are left.
- December 8 – Du Fu, Chinese poet, returns to Chang'an as a member of Emperor Xuan Zong's court, after having escaped the city during the An Lushan Rebellion.

=== By topic ===
==== Catastrophe ====
- March 9 – A major earthquake strikes Palestine and Syria.

==== Religion ====
- April 26 – Pope Stephen II dies at Rome after a 5-year reign, in which he has freed the papacy from Byzantine rule. Stephen allies with Pepin III against the Lombards, and becomes the first temporal sovereign of the Papal States. He is succeeded by his brother Paul I, as the 93rd pope of the Catholic Church.

== Births ==
- April 26 – Hisham I, Muslim emir (d. 796)
- Gisela, Frankish abbess (d. 810)
- Liu Ji, general of the Tang Dynasty (d. 810)
- Yeshe Tsogyal, consort of Trisong Detsen (d. 817)
- Hildegard of the Vinzgau, Frankish queen and wife of Charlemagne (approximate date; d. 783)

== Deaths ==
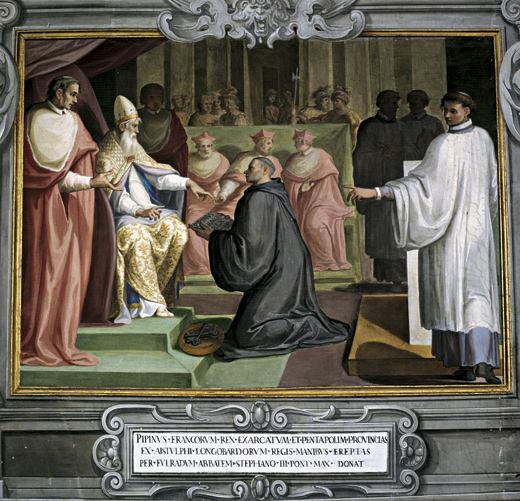
Pope Stephen II died on April 26, 757

- March 14 – Li Lin, prince of the Tang Dynasty
- April 26 – Stephen II, pope of the Catholic Church
- Æthelbald, king of Mercia
- Alfonso I, king of Asturias
- An Lushan, Chinese rebel leader
- Baldred of Tyninghame, Anglo-Saxon abbot
- Bertha of Bingen, German saint
- Crimhthann mac Reachtghal, Irish abbot
- Cummascach mac Flainn, king of Uí Failghe (Ireland)
- Geshu Han, general of the Tang Dynasty
- Habib ibn Abd al-Rahman al-Fihri, Arab noble
- Li Tan, prince of the Tang Dynasty
- Ono no Azumabito, Japanese official
- Ibn al-Muqaffa', Muslim writer (approximate date)
- Sigeberht, king of Wessex
- Suibhne of Clonfert, Irish abbot
- Tachibana no Moroe, Japanese prince (b. 684)
- Tachibana no Naramaro, Japanese statesman (b. 721)
- Zhang Xun, general of the Tang Dynasty (b. 709)
