= 728 =

Calendar year

728 in various calendars
Gregorian calendar	728; DCCXXVIII
Ab urbe condita	1481
Armenian calendar	177; ԹՎ ՃՀԷ
Assyrian calendar	5478
Balinese saka calendar	649–650
Bengali calendar	134–135
Berber calendar	1678
Buddhist calendar	1272
Burmese calendar	90
Byzantine calendar	6236–6237
Chinese calendar	丁卯年 (Fire Rabbit); 3425 or 3218 — to — 戊辰年 (Earth Dragon); 3426 or 3219
Coptic calendar	444–445
Discordian calendar	1894
Ethiopian calendar	720–721
Hebrew calendar	4488–4489
- Hindu calendars
Vikram Samvat	784–785
Shaka Samvat	649–650
Kali Yuga	3828–3829
Holocene calendar	10728
Iranian calendar	106–107
Islamic calendar	109–110
Japanese calendar	Jinki 5 (神亀５年)
Javanese calendar	621–622
Julian calendar	728; DCCXXVIII
Korean calendar	3061
Minguo calendar	1184 before ROC 民前1184年
Nanakshahi calendar	−740
Seleucid era	1039/1040 AG
Thai solar calendar	1270–1271
Tibetan calendar	མེ་མོ་ཡོས་ལོ་ (female Fire-Hare); 854 or 473 or −299 — to — ས་ཕོ་འབྲུག་ལོ་ (male Earth-Dragon); 855 or 474 or −298

Year 728 (DCCXXVIII) was a leap year starting on Thursday of the Julian calendar. It was the 728th year of the Common Era (CE) and Anno Domini (AD) designations, the 728th year of the 1st millennium, the 28th year of the 8th century, and the 9th year of the 720s decade. The denomination "728" for this year has been used since the early medieval period, when the Anno Domini calendar era became the prevalent method in Europe for naming years.

== Events ==
=== By place ===
==== Europe ====
- King Liutprand of the Lombards occupies all of the Exarchate of Ravenna. He advances towards Rome along the Via Cassia, and is met at the city of Sutri by Pope Gregory II, near the borders of the Duchy of Rome. Liutprand signs the Donation of Sutri, by which parts of Latium are given to the papacy (the first extension of papal territory in Italy). This marks the historical foundation of the Papal States.

== Births ==
- Abu Ubaidah, Muslim scholar of Arabic philology (d. 825)
- Du Huangchang, chancellor of the Tang Dynasty (or 729)

== Deaths ==
- Domnall mac Cellaig, king of Connacht (Ireland)
- Dúnchad mac Murchado, king of Leinster (Ireland)
- Hasan al-Basri, Arab theologian
- Jarir ibn Atiyah, Arab poet and satirist
