= Relief of Qasr al-Bahili =

Battle in the Umayyad conquest of Transoxiana

- Part of the Muslim conquest of Transoxiana
- Map of Khurasan and Transoxiana in the 8th century
Date	AD 720/721
Location	Unknown location, near Samarkand (modern Uzbekistan or Tajikistan)
Result	Umayyad victory

Belligerents
Umayyad Caliphate	Türgesh Khaganate

Commanders and leaders
al-Musayyab al-Riyahi	Kursul

Strength
100 families in the fort, c. 1,000 men in the relief force	10.000

The Relief of Qasr al-Bahili was the successful relief of the Arab garrison of the small fortress of Qasr al-Bahili from the siege by the Turkic Türgesh Khaganate. Sent by the Umayyad Caliphate's governor of Khurasan, an Arab relief force under al-Musayyab ibn Bishr al-Riyahi managed to break the siege and escort the garrison to safety in Samarkand.

The siege marked the beginning of the Türgesh invasion of Transoxiana, which the Arabs had only recently subdued, and which became a battleground between the two empires for the following two decades.

== Background ==
The region of Transoxiana had been conquered by the Umayyad leader Qutayba ibn Muslim in the reign of al-Walid I (r. 705–715), following the Muslim conquests of Persia and Khurasan in the mid-7th century. The loyalties of Transoxiana's native Iranian and Turkic populations and those of autonomous local rulers remained questionable, however, as demonstrated in 719, when the Transoxianian princes sent a petition to the Chinese and their Türgesh vassals for military aid against the Caliphate's governors.

The situation was made worse by the incompetence of the Arab governor Abd al-Rahman ibn Nu'aym. His successor Sa'id, who took office in 720, was not much better: he had no experience of the province and his unwarlike nature earned him the mocking sobriquet Khudhnaynah (lit. 'the Flirt'), from the Khurasanis. Sa'id appointed the capable Shu'bah ibn Zuhayr al-Nahshali as his deputy in Samarkand, but after the locals rioted, he was dismissed and replaced by Uthman ibn Abdallah ibn Mutarrif ibn al-Shikhkhir, perhaps, as H. A. R. Gibb writes, "in a vain attempt to appease the insurgents".

== Siege and relief of Qasr al-Bahili ==
The weakness of the Arab administration, and the petitions of the Transoxianian princes, led the Türgesh ruler, the khagan Suluk, to launch an attack, which caught the Arabs entirely off guard. Under the leadership of Kursul, the Türgesh were able to surround the fortress of Qasr al-Bahili ('Fort of the Bahila'), whose garrison numbered 100 families, according to the report of al-Tabari. Fearing that reinforcements from Samarkand would not arrive in time, the garrison of Qasr al-Bahili proposed to buy peace for 40,000 silver dirhams, as well as giving seventeen of their own men as hostages to Kursul until the tribute was paid.

When the Arab governor of Samarkand, Uthman ibn Abdallah ibn Mutarrif ibn al-Shikhkhir, learned of the Türgesh attack, he called for volunteers from the Arab settlers of Khurasan. 4,000 men from all the Arab tribes present in Khurasan presented themselves, but according to al-Tabari, when the appointed commander, al-Musayyab ibn Bishr, warned them that they were about to enter "the arena of the Turks, the arena of the Khāqān", where they faced death and martyrdom, 1,300 left. After he had marched a farsakh (c. 6 km), he repeated his exhortation for only the steadfast to remain with him, and another thousand left, and again the same after another farsakh, leaving him with barely 700 men. During the march, the Arabs were met by a local ruler, the king of Qiyy, who informed them of events at Qasr al-Bahili, and added that Kursul, having learned of the Arabs' approach, had slain his hostages. The king of Qiyy also warned the Arabs that all the Iranian aristocracy (dehqans) of the area had gone over to the Türgesh, and offered 300 of his own men to assist them.

When he was two farsakhs from the fort, al-Musayyab sent two riders, one Arab and one non-Arab, to approach the fort and scout out the situation under cover of night. Although the Türgesh had flooded the area around the castle to obstruct access, they managed to make contact with the garrison and inform them of the Arab army's approach, before returning to al-Musayyab. When his spies informed him of the situation, al-Musayyab decided to march immediately, and attack the Türgesh under cover of night. He instructed his men to muzzle their horses until the attack, and to focus on breaking the enemy resistance, rather than pursue anyone fleeing the battle.

With the break of dawn, the Arabs, who had approached within two bowshots of the Türgesh camp, issued the cry "Allahu Akbar", and charged. The Arabs penetrated deep into the Türgesh encampment, but the latter recovered quickly and pushed the attack back. The Arabs withdrew around their commander, with many dismounting to fight; they suffered numerous casualties in the process. According to an eyewitness who was in the fortress, "when the two armies engaged in battle, we thought that the Day of Resurrection had arrived on account of what we heard, namely, the groans emitted by the soldiers, the clashing of iron, and the neighing of the horses." In the end the Arabs prevailed, although the sources cited by al-Tabari mention no details. Al-Musayyab instructed his men to move straight for the fortress and help evacuate its garrison, and "not carry off any goods, except money, and do not carry off anyone who can walk", but only the women, children, and weak of body. Together, the Arabs made for Samarkand, so that when the Türgesh returned the next day, they found nothing but the corpses of their fallen.

== Aftermath ==
The relief of the fortress was celebrated and retold in story and song, but it also revealed the precarious situation the Muslims now faced. These events prompted the Umayyads to appoint the capable general Sa'id ibn Amr al-Harashi as governor of Khurasan. Al-Harashi quickly seized the initiative, defeated the rebels at Samarkand, and proceeded to restore Muslim rule almost to what it had been during the time of Qutayba, except for the Ferghana Valley, effective control over which was lost. Nevertheless, in 724 al-Harashi's successor Muslim ibn Sa'id al-Kilabi and his army suffered a heavy defeat (the so-called "Day of Thirst") at the hands of the Türgesh when he tried to subdue Ferghana. This defeat pushed the Arabs on the defensive, and even though no pitched battles took place, over the next few years the Arab position in Transoxiana collapsed swiftly.

Widespread dissatisfaction with the Arab rule resulted in a general uprising of Transoxiana in 728, and, with Türgesh military aid, the Arabs were evicted from almost the entire region, even invading Khurasan itself in 737. Transoxiana thereafter remained contested, and the Arabs did not recover their previous position until the campaigns of the Umayyad governor Nasr ibn Sayyar in 739–741, who took advantage of the collapse of the Türgesh khaganate into civil wars after Suluk's murder in 738.

== Sources ==
- Blankinship, Khalid Yahya (1994). The End of the Jihâd State: The Reign of Hishām ibn ʻAbd al-Malik and the Collapse of the Umayyads. Albany, New York: State University of New York Press. ISBN 978-0-7914-1827-7.
- Daniel, Elton L. (2010). "The Islamic East". In Robinson, Chase F. (ed.). The New Cambridge History of Islam, Volume 1: The Formation of the Islamic World, Sixth to Eleventh Centuries. Cambridge: Cambridge University Press. pp. 448–505. ISBN 978-0-521-83823-8.
- Gibb, H. A. R. (1923). The Arab Conquests in Central Asia. London: The Royal Asiatic Society.
- Kennedy, Hugh (2007). The Great Arab Conquests: How the Spread of Islam Changed the World We Live In. Philadelphia, Pennsylvania: Da Capo Press. ISBN 978-0-306-81740-3.
- Powers, David S., ed. (1989). The History of al-Ṭabarī, Volume XXIV: The Empire in Transition: The Caliphates of Sulaymān, ʿUmar, and Yazīd, A.D. 715–724/A.H. 96–105. SUNY Series in Near Eastern Studies. Albany, New York: State University of New York Press. ISBN 978-0-7914-0072-2.
