= Ealdbert =

Anglo-Saxon prince and rebel (died 725)

Ealdbert or Ealdberht (died 725) was an Aetheling and rebel. After being forced into exile in 722 by Ine of Wessex, to Surrey and Kingdom of Sussex, he was killed by him three years later.
