= Ye Fashan =

Ye Fashan or Yeh Fa-shan (Chinese: 葉法善; 631–720), also known as Perfect Man Ye, was a Taoist wonder-worker reportedly from the Tang dynasty.

According to hagiographic legend, he ascended to Heaven as an immortal "in broad daylight," 12 July, 720.
