= Battle of Ravenna (729) =

Middle Ages battle

Coordinates: 44°25′N 12°12′E

The Battle of Ravenna in 729 was fought between the troops of the Eastern Roman (Byzantine) Exarchate of Ravenna and a force of Lombard Italians. This was in response to Emperor Leo III the Isaurian outlawing the veneration of holy icons, which Pope Gregory II was against. After a fierce battle, the Eastern Roman Army was overcome and thousands of Byzantines were killed.
