= Jamila (singer) =

Arabic female poet of Umayyad period

Jamila جميلة
- Died: c. 720
- Occupations: Arab poet, singer, musician
- Writing career
- Language: Arabic
- Period: Islamic Golden Age (Umayyad era)

Jamila (Arabic: جميلة; born 7th-century – d. 720) was a medieval Arab Qiyan musician, singer and poetess.

== Biography ==
Jamila was a mawla of Banu Sulaym tribe and a freedwoman who converted to Islam, which was a common background for free musical artists in the Caliphate.

Together with her contemporary Azza al-Mayla (d. 705), Jamila was one of only two free female musicians known to have managed their own majlis. This was a form of entertainment session or salon, where women and men could meet, as Arab upper-class women were not yet fully subjected to gender segregation. The majlis played an important role in the musical life of Medina, in which the musicians performed and attracted patrons and students.

Jamila was renowned for her high artistic achievements, as well as an educator of celebrated male musicians. One of her students was the musician Ma'bad (d. 743), the son of an enslaved African, who said of her "in the art of music Djamila is the tree and we are the branches".

After her pilgrimage from Medina to Mecca, Jamila organized a musical event which attracted great attention and was extensively commented on by contemporary accounts. Her cortege included the principal musicians of the time, as well as 50 singing girls, and was detained because of the attention from the onlookers, and her return was the occasion of three days of musical feasts.

== See also ==
- Medieval Arabic female poets
