= 661 =

Calendar year

661 in various calendars
Gregorian calendar	661; DCLXI
Ab urbe condita	1414
Armenian calendar	110; ԹՎ ՃԺ
Assyrian calendar	5411
Balinese saka calendar	582–583
Bengali calendar	67–68
Berber calendar	1611
Buddhist calendar	1205
Burmese calendar	23
Byzantine calendar	6169–6170
Chinese calendar	庚申年 (Metal Monkey); 3358 or 3151 — to — 辛酉年 (Metal Rooster); 3359 or 3152
Coptic calendar	377–378
Discordian calendar	1827
Ethiopian calendar	653–654
Hebrew calendar	4421–4422
- Hindu calendars
Vikram Samvat	717–718
Shaka Samvat	582–583
Kali Yuga	3761–3762
Holocene calendar	10661
Iranian calendar	39–40
Islamic calendar	40–41
Japanese calendar	Hakuchi 12 (白雉１２年)
Javanese calendar	552–553
Julian calendar	661; DCLXI
Korean calendar	2994
Minguo calendar	1251 before ROC 民前1251年
Nanakshahi calendar	−807
Seleucid era	972/973 AG
Thai solar calendar	1203–1204
Tibetan calendar	ལྕགས་ཕོ་སྤྲེ་ལོ་ (male Iron-Monkey); 787 or 406 or −366 — to — ལྕགས་མོ་བྱ་ལོ་ (female Iron-Bird); 788 or 407 or −365

Expansion of the caliphate under the Umayyads: Expansion under Muhammad, 622–632 Expansion during the Rashidun Caliphate, 632–661 Expansion during the Umayyad Caliphate, 661–750

Year 661 (DCLXI) was a common year starting on Friday of the Julian calendar. The denomination 661 for this year has been used since the early medieval period, when the Anno Domini calendar era became the prevalent method in Europe for naming years.

== Events ==
=== By place ===
==== Europe ====
- King Chlothar III of Neustria and queen regent Balthild found Corbie Abbey in Picardy (northern France), giving it immunity from taxation, and visits from local bishops in exchange for prayer.
- Perctarit and Godepert become co-rulers of the Lombards, following the death of their father Aripert I. They split the kingdom, and establish their capitals in Milan and Pavia (northern Italy).

==== Britain ====
- Battle of Posbury: King Cenwalh of Wessex invades Dumnonia (south-west England). He is victorious over the native Briton tribes near Crediton in Devon, and drives them to the coast.
- King Wulfhere of Mercia and his army harry the Berkshire Downs (south of Thame) and move south to conquer the Meonwara and the Isle of Wight.
- Wulfhere appoints Æthelwealh as king of Sussex, and Æthelwealh is baptized in Mercia. He receives the recently-conquered territories in modern-day Hampshire.

==== Arabian Empire (Islamic Caliphate) ====
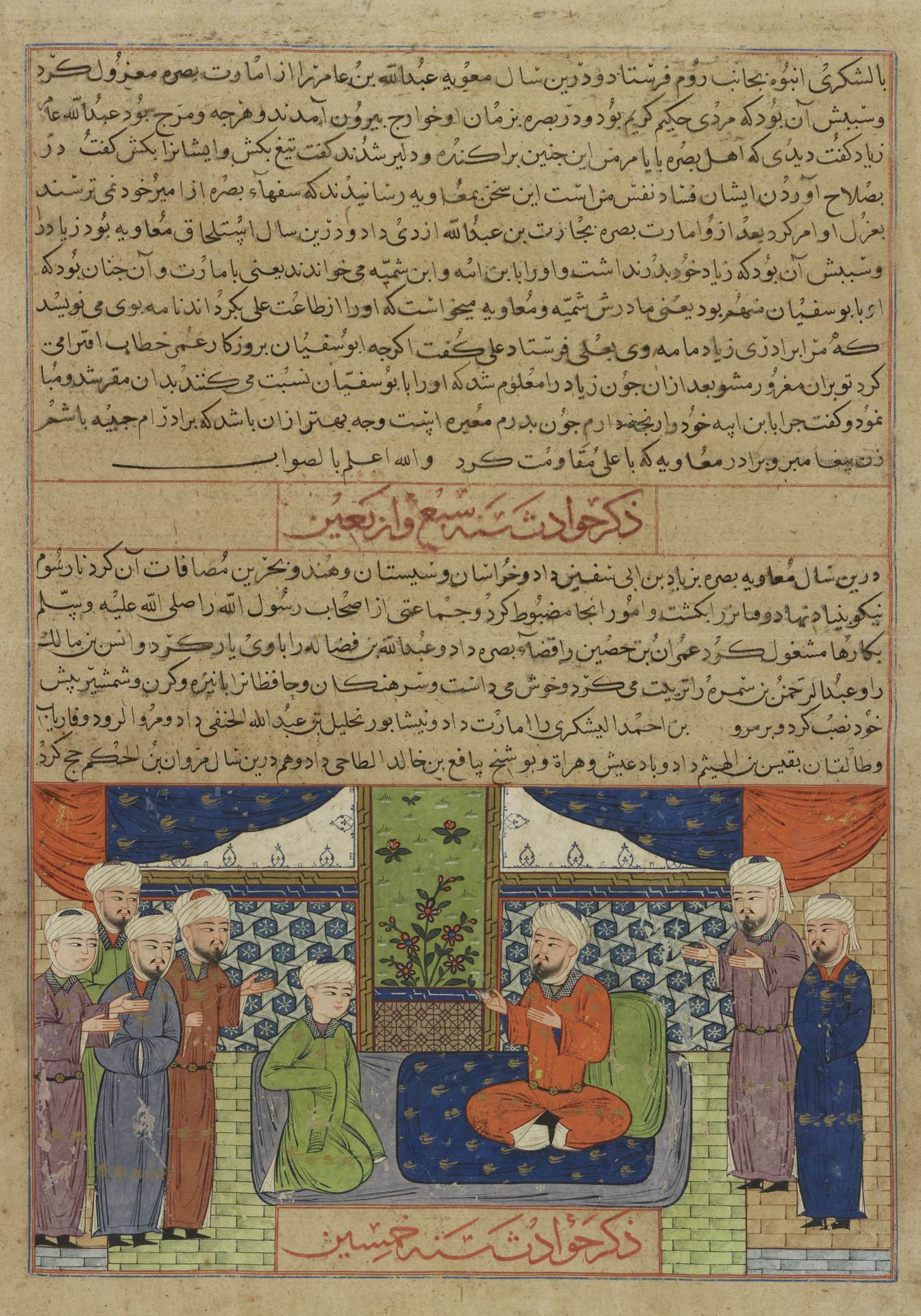
Muawiya I became caliph in mid 661, after the Abdication of caliph al-Hasan. Muawiya established the Umayyad dynasty (Muawiya with Councillors, from the manuscript of Hafiz-i Abru’s Majma’ al-tawarikh)

- January 26 – Assassination of Ali: Ali ibn Abi Talib, first Shia imam and fourth caliph of the Rashidun Caliphate, is struck on the head with a poisoned sword by the Khawarij Abd-al-Rahman ibn Muljam, while at prayer at a shrine at Kufa (modern-day), dying two days later. His son, Hasan ibn Ali, is chosen by Muslims to succeed him as the next leader. According to the Umayyads, he is succeeded by Muawiyah I as Caliph, age 59, who moves his seat of government to Damascus, and founds the Umayyad Caliphate, ending the Rashidun Caliphate.
- Approximate date – Muawiya I imprisons patriarch Giwargis I, after his refusal to pay tribute. Christians are persecuted and their churches are destroyed.

==== Japan ====
- Approximate date – The imperial fleet of Japan invades Kyūshū by the order of Empress Saimei. On its way, princess Nukata composes a famous poem at Nikitatsu in Iyo Province.
- c. May – Empress Saimei builds the palace of Asakura in Kyūshū, from trees cut down from the shrines. Two months later she dies. People say it is because the gods are angry with her for destroying the shrines.
- July 24 – Emperor Tenji ascends to the throne of Japan after his mother Empress Saimei’s death. He sends an expeditionary force under Abe no Hirafu to Korea, to help the allied kingdom of Baekje.

==== Korea ====
- King Munmu becomes the 30th ruler of the Korean kingdom of Silla.

=== By topic ===
==== Religion ====
- Maximus the Confessor, Christian monk, is recalled from exile in Thrace. He is tried, and sentenced to mutilation. His tongue and his right hand are cut off to prevent his further opposition to the Monothelites.
- Approximate date – In Gaul all Roman bishops are replaced with Frankish bishops. They become increasingly common, as Frankish leaders control the episcopate.

== Births ==
- February 12 – Ōku, Japanese princess (d. 702)
- Early June – Al-Hajjaj ibn Yusuf, Arab governor (d. 714)
- Approximate date – Ælfwine, Northumbrian king of Deira (k. 679)
- Chen Zi'ang, Chinese poet and official (d. 702)
- Liu Zhiji, Chinese historian (d. 721)

== Deaths ==
- January 3 – Benjamin, Coptic Orthodox Patriarch of Alexandria (b. c.590)
- January 28 – Ali, first Shia Imam and Fourth Rashidun Caliph (b. 601) (martyred)
- February 17 – Finan of Lindisfarne, Irish-born bishop
- July 24 – Kōgyoku (also Saimei), twice empress of Japan (b. 594)
- Aripert I, king of the Lombards
- Cenberht, West Saxon king in Wessex
- Cuthred, West Saxon prince in Wessex
- Approximate date – Landry, bishop of Paris
- Al-Ash'ath ibn Qays, companion of the Muhammad
