= Æthelburg of Wessex =

Consort of King Ine of Wessex from 688 to 726

Æthelburg

Consort of the King of Wessex
- Tenure: c. 688–726
- Born: c. 673
- Died: c. 740 (aged 66–67); Rome
- Spouse: Ine of Wessex

Æthelburg (also Æthelburh or Ethelburga) (ca. 673–740) was Queen of Wessex by marriage to King Ine of Wessex. Perhaps most famed for her act in 722, when she destroyed the stronghold of Taunton (which had been built by Ine) in an attempt to find the rebel Ealdbert.

== Life ==
Æthelburg was born circa 673. She was the wife of King Ine of Wessex. Æthelburg is considered by some historians to be one of the few Anglo-Saxon women warriors.

In 722, Æthelburg burned down the city of Taunton, a city built by Ine. Ine himself was absent at the time, fighting the South Saxons. Æthelburg's exact motivations for burning down the city are not clear, but she was either trying to find the rebel Ealdbert or she was trying to prevent Taunton from being taken by the rebels. According to the Anglo-Saxon Chronicle, Ealdbert "wandered a wretched exile in Surrey and Sussex" because of this. Ealdbert would be killed by Æthelburg's husband Ine three years later.

In 726 Æthelburg went on a pilgrimage to Rome with her husband King Ine of Wessex who had abdicated the throne, he left no clear heir. Both Æthelburg and King Ine died in Rome.

== Legacy ==
Æthelburg is a featured figure on Judy Chicago's installation piece The Dinner Party, being represented as one of the 999 names on the Heritage Floor. In The Dinner Party the character Æthelburg is actually a combination of Æthelburg of Wessex and Æthelburg of Kent, which she is often confused with. She is associated with the place setting for Theodora.

Æthelburg and Ine are both point-of-view characters in Lucy Holland's novel Song Of The Huntress.

== See also ==
- House of Wessex family tree

== Bibliography ==
- Chicago, Judy. The Dinner Party: From Creation to Preservation. London: Merrell (2007). ISBN 1-85894-370-1
