= 760s =

Decade

The 760s decade ran from January 1, 760, to December 31, 769.

== Events ==
=== 760 ===
==== By place ====
====== Europe ======
- Frankish King Pepin III ("the Short") begins his expedition to Septimania and Aquitaine. He conquers the cities of Carcassonne, Toulouse, Rodez and Albi. Duke Waifer of Aquitaine confiscates the Church lands, and plunders Burgundy. Pepin invades Aquitanian-held Berry and the Auvergne, capturing the fortresses of Bourbon and Clermont. Waifer's Basque troops are defeated by the Franks, and deported into northern France with their children and wives.

====== Britain ======
- Battle of Hereford: The Welsh kingdoms of Brycheiniog, Gwent and Powys defeat the Mercians under King Offa at Hereford. They free themselves from the influence of the Anglo-Saxons.
- Offa's Dyke is constructed around this time, according to the traditional history of this defensive earthwork. This 150-mile-long (240-kilometer) earthwork marks the current border with the Welsh kingdoms, between England and Wales (approximate date). However, modern analysis of Offa's Dyke suggests that it was built in the 5th century, well before the reign of King Offa.

====== China ======
- Former emperor Xuanzong is placed under house arrest by the eunuch official Li Fuguo, with the support of Xuanzong's son, Suzong. Li Fuguo is appointed commander of the Imperial Guards, possessing nearly absolute power during Suzong's reign.
- The Kingdom of Nanzhao (Nanchao) in modern-day southern China expands into the Irrawaddy River region, first into Burma, then down into northern Laos and Thailand (approximate date).
- Lu Yu begins writing The Classic of Tea.

====== Mesoamerica ======
- The Maya city of Dos Pilas (modern Guatemala) is abandoned, after the Tamarindito and Petexbatún centres revolt against their Dos Pilas overlord.

==== By topic ====
====== Religion ======
- The Church of Santa Sophia is founded by the Lombard duke Arechis II in Benevento (approximate date).
- The Kailasa Temple is built on the orders of King Krishna I, of the Rashtrakuta Dynasty (modern India) (approximate date).
- Bregowine is appointed archbishop of Canterbury in England.

=== 761 ===
==== By place ====
====== Britain ======
- August 6 – Battle of Eildon: King Æthelwald Moll of Northumbria faces a rebellion, under a rival claimant to the throne named Oswine, brother of the murdered King Oswulf of Northumbria. Oswine is killed after a three-day battle against the forces of Æthelwald in Scotland.
- Bridei V succeeds his brother Óengus I as king of the Picts (modern Scotland).

====== Europe ======
- The city of Oviedo (Northern Spain) is founded by the monks Nolan and John (approximate date).
- Construction is completed on the 108-room Castello di Lunghezza outside of Rome, Italy.

====== Abbasid Caliphate ======
- An Abbasid Caliphate army reconquers the city of Kairouan (in modern-day Tunisia), from 'Abd al-Rahmān ibn Rustam of the Rustamid dynasty. The latter is forced to flee west, where he creates an autonomous state around Tihert (Tiaret).
- Khurshid II, the last ruler (spāhbed) of Tabaristan, poisons himself when he learns that his family has been captured by the Abbasids.

====== Asia ======
- The Japanese priest Dōkyō cures Empress Kōken by using prayers and potions. He may have become her lover and certainly becomes her court favorite, arousing the jealousy of Emperor Junnin.
- A great Chinese famine in the Huai-Yangtze area, late in the year, drives many people to cannibalism (approximate date).

=== 762 ===
==== By place ====
====== Europe ======
- Vinekh, ruler (khagan) of the Bulgarian Empire, dies after a six-year reign. He is succeeded by Telets, ending the rule of the Vokil clan, and beginning the reign of the Ugain clan.
- Al-Ala ibn Mugith, supporter of the Abbasid cause, is defeated by the Umayyad emir of al-Andalus, Abd al-Rahman I, at Beja (modern-day Portugal).

====== Britain ======
- King Æthelbert II of Kent dies, and is succeeded by his nephew Eadberht II. He possibly rules all Kent for a time. Sigered, probably an East Saxon, succeeds in West Kent. Eadberht dies after a short reign, followed by Ealhmund as ruler of Kent.
- King Æthelwald of Northumbria marries his queen, Æthelthryth, at Catterick (North Yorkshire).

====== Abbasid Caliphate ======
- July 30 – Caliph al-Mansur moves the seat of the Abbasid Caliphate from Kufa to the new capital of Baghdad.
- September 25 – The Alid Revolt begins: Muhammad al-Nafs al-Zakiyya raises the banner against the Abbasids at Medina, followed by his brother Ibrahim ibn Abdallah at Basra in early 763. Muhammad's rebellion is suppressed, and he is killed by Abbasid troops under Isa ibn Musa.

====== Asia ======
- The Chinese official Li Fuguo murders Empress Zhang, wife of Emperor Su Zong. Shortly afterward Su Zong dies of a heart attack; he is succeeded by his son Dai Zong, who kills Li by sending assassins.

==== By topic ====
====== Religion ======
- Schäftlarn Abbey (Bavaria) is founded by Waltrich, a Benedictine monk of noble family, south of modern-day Munich, Germany.

=== 763 ===
==== By place ====
====== Byzantine Empire ======
- June – Battle of Anchialus: Emperor Constantine V sends a Byzantine expeditionary force (800 ships and 9,600 cavalry) to Thrace, to defend the fortress city of Anchialus on the Black Sea Coast. Meanwhile, Telets, ruler (khagan) of the Bulgarian Empire, blocks the mountain passes and takes positions on the heights near Anchialus. During a desperate cavalry charge, the Bulgars are defeated and many are captured; Telets manages to escape. Constantine enters Constantinople in triumph, and kills all the prisoners.

====== Europe ======
- August – Byzantine troops invade the Papal States, in alliance with King Desiderius of the Lombards. King Pepin III ("the Short") intervenes, and begins negotiations between the Lombards and Pope Paul I. Desiderius promises to end the hostilities, but on condition that Pepin sends back Lombard hostages held by the Franks.

====== Britain ======
- Ciniod I succeeds Bridei V, as king of the Picts (modern Scotland).

====== Abbasid Caliphate ======
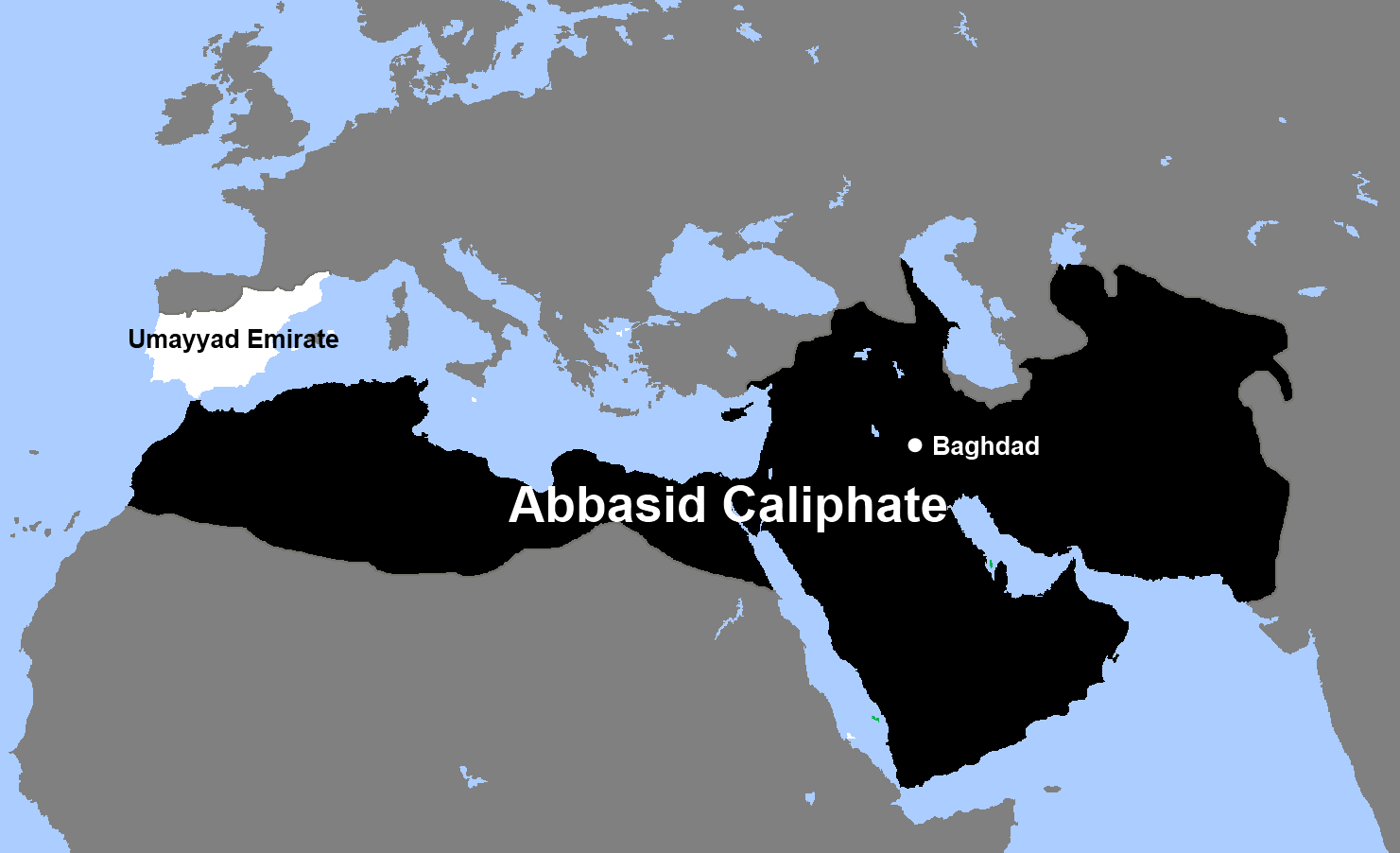
Abbasid Caliphate under Al-Mansur (r. 754–775) in black and Emirate of Córdoba in white

- In 763 Al-Mansur sent his troops to conquer Al-Andalus for the Abbasid empire. But the ruler Abd al-Rahman I successfully defended his territory. Al-Mansur withdrew and thereafter focused his troops on holding the eastern part of his empire on lands that were once part of Persia.
- January 21 – Battle of Bakhamra: The Abbasid army under Isa ibn Musa defeats the Alids, and puts an end to their rebellion. The power of the Abbasid dynasty is consolidated.

====== Asia ======
- February 17 – An Lushan Rebellion: Emperor Shi Chaoyi hangs himself to avoid being captured by Tang troops sent by the renegade Li Huaixian, ending the 7-year rebellion against the Tang dynasty in China.
- November 18 – Forces of the Tibetan Empire, under Trisong Detsen, occupy the Tang capital of Chang'an (modern Xi'an) for 15 days, and install a puppet emperor. Tibetans take over the horse pastures.

====== Central America ======
- July 2 – Yax Pasaj Chan Yopaat ("Rising Sun") becomes the new ruler of the Mayan city state of Copán in Honduras after the death of Kʼakʼ Yipyaj Chan Kʼawiil, who had reigned since 749. Yax Pasaj reigns until 810.

=== 764 ===
==== By place ====
====== Europe ======
- Domenico Monegario is deposed, after Pope Paul I demanded donations from Venice. Monegario is blinded and exiled, and succeeded by Maurizio Galbaio as the 7th doge of Venice. During his reign, Venetian wealth is increased via trade.

====== Britain ======
- King Offa of Mercia conquers Kent, and brings an end to the rule of kings Ealhmund and Sigered in West Kent. He imposes Mercian overlordship on the kingdom, but allows a local king, Heaberht, to rule there.

====== Asia ======
- October 14–21 – Fujiwara no Nakamaro Rebellion: A short-lived revolt led by Fujiwara no Nakamaro is suppressed. Emperor Junnin is deposed after a 6-year reign, and forced into exile. Former empress Kōken reassumes the imperial throne of Japan, and takes the name Shōtoku. She appoints her close associate, the priest Dōkyō, prime minister (taishi), running the government with him. Nakamaro is captured and killed with his wife and children.

==== By topic ====
====== Geography ======
- According to the historian Theophanes the Confessor, icebergs float past Constantinople from the Black Sea (approximate date).

====== Religion ======
- Cancor, a Frankish count (possibly of Hesbaye), founds Lorsch Abbey (modern-day Germany).

=== 765 ===
==== By place ====
====== Europe ======
- King Pepin III ("the Short") restores the papal privileges (see Donation of Pepin) in Benevento and Tuscany territory (and partially in Spoleto).
- The Annals of Tigernach tell of a shortage of bread in Ireland.

====== Britain ======
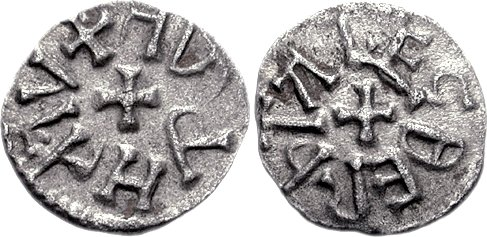
Sceat of King Alhred (r. 765–774)

- King Æthelwald of Northumbria is deposed at Pincanheale, possibly at a gathering of his own magnates. He is succeeded by Alhred, a distant cousin of the late king Oswulf.

====== Abbasid Caliphate ======
- The Zenata Berber tribe of Banu Ifran rebels against the Abbasid Caliphate, and creates an independent state centered around Tlemcen (modern Algeria). Their tribal chief Abu Qurra rebuilds the city (formerly, the Roman colonia Pomaria).

==== By topic ====
====== Agriculture ======
- European writings make the first known mention of a three-field system in use in medieval Europe. The crop rotation is the practice of growing a series of different types of crops in the same area in sequential seasons. Under this system, the land of an estate or village is divided into three large fields, and makes a given section of land productive 2 years out of 3, instead of every other year (approximate date).

=== 766 ===
==== By place ====
====== Byzantine Empire ======
- August 25 – Emperor Constantine V publicly humiliates 19 high-ranking officials in the Hippodrome of Constantinople, after discovering a plot against him. He executes the leaders, Constantine Podopagouros and his brother Strategios, and blinds and exiles the rest.
- Autumn – Siege of Kamacha: Abbasid forces under al-Hasan ibn Qahtaba are defeated at the fortress city of Kamacha, in eastern Cappadocia (modern Turkey). A Byzantine relief army (12,000 men) forces the Abbasids to retreat into Armenia.
- Sabin, ruler (khagan) of Bulgaria, flees to the Byzantine fortress city of Mesembria, from where he escapes to Constantinople. Constantine V arranges for the transfer of Sabin's family from Bulgaria.

====== Abbasid Caliphate ======
- Baghdad nears completion as up to 100,000 labourers create a circular city about 1 or 2 km in diameter (depending on the source). In the center of the "Round City" is a palace built for Caliph al-Mansur. The capital is ringed by three lines of walls (approximate date).

====== Asia ======
- The Karluks defeat the Turgesh Khaganate in Central Asia. Most of Turkestan (former Onoq territory) falls under Karluk rule, except west of Lake Aral, where the loose confederation of the Oghuz Turks is about to emerge.

==== By topic ====
====== Religion ======
- Summer – Patriarch Constantine II is deposed and jailed, after the discovery of Constantine Podopagouros' plot against Constantine V. Nicetas I is appointed patriarch of Constantinople.
- Metten Abbey, near the town of Deggendorf (Bavaria), is founded by Gamelbert of Michaelsbuch.

=== 767 ===
==== By place ====
====== Byzantine Empire ======
- Byzantine–Bulgarian War: Emperor Constantine V invades Bulgaria across the Balkan Mountains, setting afire some settlements around the Bulgarian capital of Pliska. Constantine accepts a peace agreement with Pagan, the Bulgar ruler (khagan), whose land is in anarchy.

====== Europe ======
- The Franks, under King Pepin III ("the Short"), destroy resistance in central Aquitaine. They conquer the capital of Bordeaux, and devastate the whole region.
- Pepin III receives a Byzantine delegation at his court in Gentilly (southern suburbs of Paris). They discuss foreign policy regarding Italy, and Byzantine Iconoclasm.

====== Egypt ======
- The Bashmurian revolts continues in Egypt. A general revolt of the Delta takes place. The Egyptians joined with Arab settlers against the Abbasid government. Local officials were killed, and the governor Yazīd ibn Ḥātim sent a force against them, but it was defeated and forced to retreat to al-Fusṭāṭ.

====== Africa ======
- The Kharijite Berbers of Tlemcen and Tiaret try to conquer Ifriqiya from the Abbasid Caliphate, but fail to capture the capital of Kairouan (modern Tunisia).

==== By topic ====
====== Religion ======
- June 28 – Pope Paul I dies at Rome after a 10-year reign, in which he has protested against Constantine V's revival of Iconoclasm at Constantinople. He gives refuge to Greek monks who were expelled from the Byzantine Empire, and moves the relics of many saints from the catacombs to Roman churches. Duke Toto of Nepi has his layman brother elected to succeed Paul, under the name Constantine II.

=== 768 ===
==== By place ====
====== Frankish Kingdom ======
- September 24 – King Pepin III (the Short) dies at Saint-Denis, Neustria. The Frankish Kingdom is divided between his two sons: Charlemagne and Carloman I. According to Salic law Charlemagne receives the outer parts of the kingdom bordering on the sea, namely Neustria, western Aquitaine, and the northern parts of Austrasia; while Carloman is awarded his uncle's former share, the inner parts: southern Austrasia, Septimania, eastern Aquitaine, Burgundy, Provence, Swabia, and the lands bordering Italy.
- Waiofar, duke of Aquitaine, and his family are captured and executed by the Franks in the forest of Périgord. Waiofar's kinsman Hunald II succeeds to his claims and continues to fight against Charlemagne.

====== Iberian Peninsula ======
- Fruela I (the Cruel), the King of Asturias, is assassinated in Cangas, his capital, after he murders his brother Vimerano. Fruela is succeeded by his cousin Aurelius, who is chosen by the nobility.
- In al-Andalus, the Berber tribal chieftain Saqiya ibn Abd al Wahid al-Miknasi leads a rebellion against the Emirate of Córdoba, in the present-day Spanish province of Extremadura.

====== Britain ======
- King Alhred of Northumbria marries Princess Osgifu, possibly daughter of the late king Oswulf (approximate date).

====== Asia ======
- The Kasuga Shrine is erected at Nara (Japan), by the Fujiwara family. The interior is famous for its many bronze lanterns, as well as the stone lanterns that lead up to the Shinto shrine

==== By topic ====
====== Religion ======
- August 7 – Pope Stephen III succeeds Paul I as the 94th pope of the Catholic Church. The antipope Constantine II is overthrown at Rome, through intervention by King Desiderius of the Lombards, after a brief reign (see 767).
- Lebuinus, Anglo-Saxon missionary, founds the city of Deventer (modern-day Netherlands), and builds a wooden church on the bank of the River IJssel (approximate date).
- Archbishop Elfodd of Gwynedd persuades the Welsh Church to accept the Roman dating of Easter, as agreed by the British Church at the Synod of Whitby (see 664).

=== 769 ===
==== By place ====
====== Europe ======
- King Charlemagne (Charles "the Great") begins a military campaign against the Duchy of Aquitaine and the Duchy of Gascony. He leads a Frankish army to the city of Bordeaux, where he sets up a fort at Fronsac. His younger brother Carloman I refuses to help his brother fight the rebels, and returns to Burgundy. Hunald, duke of Aquitaine, is forced to flee to the court of Gascony. Lupus II, fearing Charlemagne, turns Hunald over in exchange for peace, and is put in a monastery. Aquitaine and Gascony are subdued into the Frankish Kingdom.

==== By topic ====
====== Religion ======
- April 12–15 – Pope Stephen III holds a Lateran Council: the papal election procedure (abuse of which has led to the election of antipopes) is changed, and the iconoclasm of the Council of Hieria is anathematized.
- Tallaght Monastery is founded in Ireland by Máel Ruain; it becomes a centre of learning and piety, particularly associated with the Culdees' (Céli Dé) spiritual reform movement.
- Hersfeld Abbey (modern-day Hesse-Nassau), Germany, is founded by Lullus, archbishop of Mainz (approximate date).

== Births ==
760

- Angilbert, Frankish diplomat and abbot (approximate date)
- Fujiwara no Otomuro, Japanese empress consort (d. 790)
- Jonas, bishop of Orléans (approximate date)
- Sibawayh, Persian linguist and grammarian (approximate date)
- Theodulf, bishop of Orléans (approximate date)
- Theophanes the Confessor, Byzantine monk (or 758)
- Thomas the Slav, Byzantine general (approximate date)
- Wei Guanzhi, Chinese chancellor (d. 821)
- Zhang Hongjing, Chinese chancellor (d. 824)

761

- Shun Zong, emperor of the Tang dynasty (d. 806)
- Wu Chongyin, general of the Tang dynasty (d. 827)

762

- Æthelred I, king of Northumbria (d. 796)
- Sayyida Nafisa, Arab scholar (d. 824)

763

- Haito, bishop of Basel
- Harun al-Rashid, Muslim caliph (or 766)
- Wang, empress of the Tang dynasty (d. 816)

764

- Abu Thawr, Muslim scholar (d. 854)
- Al-Hadi, Muslim caliph (d. 786)
- Fujiwara no Nakanari, Japanese nobleman (d. 810)
- Li Jiang, chancellor of the Tang Dynasty (d. 830)
- Tian Hongzheng, general of the Tang Dynasty (d. 821)

765

- Ali al-Ridha, Shī‘ah Imām and Muslim scholar (d. 818)
- Fastrada, Frankish queen consort (d. 794)
- Han Hong, general of the Tang dynasty (d. 823)
- Pei Du, chancellor of the Tang dynasty (d. 839)

766

- Al-Fadl ibn Yahya al-Barmaki, Muslim governor (d. 808)
- Ali al-Ridha, 8th Shia Imam (d. 818)
- Harun al-Rashid, Muslim caliph (or 763)
- Li Cheng, chancellor of the Tang Dynasty
- Zhang Ji, Chinese scholar and poet (approximate date)

767

- September 15 – Saichō, Japanese Buddhist monk (d. 822)
- Bishr al-Hafi, Muslim theologian (approximate date)
- Ja'far ibn Yahya, Persian vizier (d. 803)
- Muhammad ibn Idris al-Shafi`i, Muslim imam (d. 820)
- Pepin the Hunchback, son of Charlemagne (approximate date)

768

- Han Yu, Chinese philosopher and poet (d. 824)
- Konstanti Kakhi, Georgian nobleman (d. 853)
- Song Ruoxin, Chinese scholar, poet and lady-in-waiting (d. 820)
- Xue Tao, Chinese poet (d. 831)

769

- Du Yuanying, chancellor of the Tang dynasty (d. 833)
- Egbert, king of Wessex (or 771)
- Pepin the Hunchback, the first child of Charlemagne

== Deaths ==
760

- October 26 – Cuthbert, archbishop of Canterbury
- Dumnagual III, king of Alt Clut (Scotland)
- Gangulphus, Burgundian courtier
- Kōmyō, empress of Japan (b. 701)
- Liutprand, duke of Benevento (approximate date)
- Muiredach mac Murchado, king of Leinster (Ireland)
- Wu Daozi, Chinese painter (approximate date)

761

- December 23 – Gaubald, bishop of Regensburg
- Donngal mac Laidcnén, king of the Uí Ceinnselaig (Ireland)
- Ibn Ishaq, Arab historian and hagiographer (or 767)
- Khurshid II, ruler (spāhbed) of Tabaristan (b. 734)
- Óengus I, king of the Picts
- Shi Siming, general of the Tang dynasty (b. 703)
- Empress Xin of China (b. unknown date)

762

- Æthelbert II, king of Kent
- Ashot III, Armenian prince
- Eadberht II, king of Kent
- Eardwulf, king of Kent
- Gao Lishi, Chinese official and eunuch (b. 684)
- Li Bai, (also Li Po), Chinese poet (b. 701)
- Li Fuguo, Chinese official and eunuch (b. 704)
- Milo, Frankish bishop (or 763)
- Muhammad al-Nafs al-Zakiyya, Arab rebel leader
- Su Zong, emperor of the Tang dynasty (b. 711)
- Vinekh, ruler (khagan) of the Bulgarian Empire
- Xuan Zong, emperor of Tang dynasty (b. 685)
- Zhang, empress of the Tang dynasty

763

- November 20 – Domnall Midi, High King of Ireland
- Bridei V, king of the Picts
- Fang Guan, chancellor of the Tang dynasty (b. 697)
- Jianzhen, Chinese Buddhist monk (b. 688)
- Shi Chaoyi, emperor of the Yan (Anshi) state
- Wei Jiansu, chancellor of the Tang dynasty (b. 687)

764

- January 17 – Joseph of Freising, German bishop
- Arwa bint Mansur al-Himyari, wife of caliph al-Mansur.
- Abdallah ibn Ali, Muslim general
- Bregowine, archbishop of Canterbury
- Fujiwara no Nakamaro, Japanese statesman (b. 706)
- Stephen the Younger, Byzantine theologian (or 765)

765

- September 27 – Pugu Huai'en, Chinese general during the Tang dynasty
- Ceolwulf, king of Northumbria
- Domnall Midi, High King of Ireland
- Ealdwulf, bishop of Lindsey
- Eardwulf, king of Kent
- Flaithbertach mac Loingsig, High King of Ireland
- Fujiwara no Toyonari, Japanese politician (b. 704)
- Gao Shi, Chinese poet
- Gyeongdeok, king of Silla (Korea)
- Hemele, bishop of Lichfield
- Ja'far al-Sadiq, sixth Shī‘ah Imām and Muslim scholar (b. 702)
- Junnin, emperor of Japan (b. 733)
- Miao Jinqing, chancellor of the Tang dynasty (b. 685)
- Stephen the Younger, Byzantine theologian (or 764)
- Telets, ruler (khagan) of the Bulgarian Empire
- Tello, bishop of Chur (approximate date)
- Wang Changling, Chinese poet and official (b. 698)

766

- March 6 – Chrodegang, Frankish bishop
- August 25
  - Constantine Podopagouros, Byzantine official
  - Strategios Podopagouros, Byzantine general
- Abdullah al-Aftah, Shī‘ah Imam and Muslim scholar
- Fallomon mac Con Congalt, king of Mide (Ireland)
- Fujiwara no Matate, Japanese nobleman (b. 715)
- Muhammad ibn al-Ash'ath al-Khuza'i, Muslim governor

767

- April 20 – Taichō, Japanese Buddhist monk (b. 682)
- June 28 – Paul I, pope of the Catholic Church (b. 700)
- Abū Hanīfa, Muslim imam and scholar (b. 699)
- Aedh Ailghin, king of Uí Maine (Ireland)
- Constantine II, patriarch of Constantinople
- Ibn Ishaq, Muslim historian and hagiographer (or 761)
- Ibn Jurayj, Muslim scholar (approximate date)
- Muqatil ibn Sulayman, Muslim mufassir and theologian
- Murchad mac Flaithbertaig, chief of the Cenél Conaill
- Toktu, ruler (khagan) of the Bulgarian Empire

768

- August 20 – Eadberht, king of Northumbria
- September 24 – Pepin the Short, king of the Franks (b. 714)
- Dub-Indrecht mac Cathail, king of Connacht (Ireland)
- Fruela I, king of Asturias
- Li Huaixian, general of the Tang Dynasty
- Pagan, ruler (khagan) of the Bulgarian Empire
- Toto, duke of Nepi
- Waiofar, duke of Aquitaine
- Winibald, Anglo-Saxon abbot
- Yaxun B'alam IV, ruler (ajaw) of Yaxchilan (b. 709)

769

- January 14 – Cui Huan, chancellor of the Tang dynasty
- March 9 – Alan of Farfa, Aquitanian scholar and hermit
- December 13 – Du Hongjian, chancellor of the Tang dynasty (b. 709)
- Conchubhar mac Cumasgach, king of Uí Fiachrach Aidhne (Ireland)
- Cuthfrith, bishop of Lichfield (approximate date)
- Dub Calgaid mac Laidcnén, king of the Uí Ceinnselaig (Ireland)
- Gülnar Hatun, legendary Turkish heroine
- Ma'n ibn Za'ida al-Shaybani, Arab general and governor (or 770)

== Sources ==
- Brooks, E. W. (1913). "The Relations Between the Empire and Egypt from a New Arabic Source". Byzantinische Zeitschrift. 22 (2): 381–391. doi:10.1515/byzs.1913.22.2.381. S2CID 191661543.
- Megally, Mounir (1991). "Bashmuric Revolts". In Aziz Suryal Atiya (ed.). The Coptic Encyclopedia. Vol. 2. New York: Macmillan Publishers. cols. 349b–351b.
