= 762 =

Calendar year

762 in various calendars
Gregorian calendar	762; DCCLXII
Ab urbe condita	1515
Armenian calendar	211; ԹՎ ՄԺԱ
Assyrian calendar	5512
Balinese saka calendar	683–684
Bengali calendar	168–169
Berber calendar	1712
Buddhist calendar	1306
Burmese calendar	124
Byzantine calendar	6270–6271
Chinese calendar	辛丑年 (Metal Ox); 3459 or 3252 — to — 壬寅年 (Water Tiger); 3460 or 3253
Coptic calendar	478–479
Discordian calendar	1928
Ethiopian calendar	754–755
Hebrew calendar	4522–4523
- Hindu calendars
Vikram Samvat	818–819
Shaka Samvat	683–684
Kali Yuga	3862–3863
Holocene calendar	10762
Iranian calendar	140–141
Islamic calendar	144–145
Japanese calendar	Tenpyō-hōji 6 (天平宝字６年)
Javanese calendar	656–657
Julian calendar	762; DCCLXII
Korean calendar	3095
Minguo calendar	1150 before ROC 民前1150年
Nanakshahi calendar	−706
Seleucid era	1073/1074 AG
Thai solar calendar	1304–1305
Tibetan calendar	ལྕགས་མོ་གླང་ལོ་ (female Iron-Ox); 888 or 507 or −265 — to — ཆུ་ཕོ་སྟག་ལོ་ (male Water-Tiger); 889 or 508 or −264

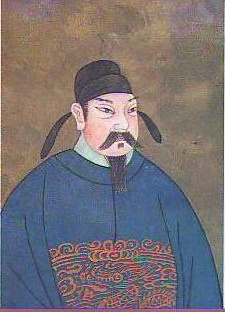
Emperor Dai Zong (727–779)

Year 762 (DCCLXII) was a common year starting on Friday of the Julian calendar, the 762nd year of the Common Era (CE) and Anno Domini (AD) designations, the 762nd year of the 1st millennium, the 62nd year of the 8th century, and the 3rd year of the 760s decade. The denomination 762 for this year has been used since the early medieval period, when the Anno Domini calendar era became the prevalent method in Europe for naming years.

== Events ==
=== By place ===
==== Europe ====
- Vinekh, ruler (khagan) of the Bulgarian Empire, dies after a six-year reign. He is succeeded by Telets, ending the rule of the Vokil clan, and beginning the reign of the Ugain clan.
- Al-Ala ibn Mugith, supporter of the Abbasid cause, is defeated by the Umayyad emir of al-Andalus, Abd al-Rahman I, at Beja (modern-day Portugal).

==== Britain ====
- King Æthelbert II of Kent dies, and is succeeded by his nephew Eadberht II. He possibly rules all Kent for a time. Sigered, probably an East Saxon, succeeds in West Kent. Eadberht dies after a short reign, followed by Ealhmund as ruler of Kent.
- King Æthelwald of Northumbria marries his queen, Æthelthryth, at Catterick (North Yorkshire).

==== Abbasid Caliphate ====
- July 30 – Caliph al-Mansur moves the seat of the Abbasid Caliphate from Kufa to the new capital of Baghdad.
- September 25 – The Alid Revolt begins: Muhammad al-Nafs al-Zakiyya raises the banner against the Abbasids at Medina, followed by his brother Ibrahim ibn Abdallah at Basra in early 763. Muhammad's rebellion is suppressed, and he is killed by Abbasid troops under Isa ibn Musa.

==== Asia ====
- The Chinese official Li Fuguo murders Empress Zhang, wife of Emperor Su Zong. Shortly afterward Su Zong dies of a heart attack; he is succeeded by his son Dai Zong, who kills Li by sending assassins.

=== By topic ===
==== Religion ====
- Schäftlarn Abbey (Bavaria) is founded by Waltrich, a Benedictine monk of noble family, south of modern-day Munich, Germany.

== Births ==
- Æthelred I, king of Northumbria (d. 796)
- Sayyida Nafisa, Arab scholar (d. 824)

== Deaths ==
- Æthelbert II, king of Kent
- Ashot III, Armenian prince
- Eadberht II, king of Kent
- Eardwulf, king of Kent
- Gao Lishi, Chinese official and eunuch (b. 684)
- Li Bai, (also Li Po), Chinese poet (b. 701)
- Li Fuguo, Chinese official and eunuch (b. 704)
- Milo, Frankish bishop (or 763)
- Muhammad al-Nafs al-Zakiyya, Arab rebel leader
- Su Zong, emperor of the Tang dynasty (b. 711)
- Vinekh, ruler (khagan) of the Bulgarian Empire
- Xuan Zong, emperor of Tang dynasty (b. 685)
- Zhang, empress of the Tang dynasty
