= AD 767 =

Calendar year

767 in various calendars
- Gregorian calendar: 767; DCCLXVII
- Ab urbe condita: 1520
- Armenian calendar: 216; ԹՎ ՄԺԶ
- Assyrian calendar: 5517
- Balinese saka calendar: 688–689
- Bengali calendar: 173–174
- Berber calendar: 1717
- Buddhist calendar: 1311
- Burmese calendar: 129
- Byzantine calendar: 6275–6276
- Chinese calendar: 丙午年 (Fire Horse); 3464 or 3257 — to — 丁未年 (Fire Goat); 3465 or 3258
- Coptic calendar: 483–484
- Discordian calendar: 1933
- Ethiopian calendar: 759–760
- Hebrew calendar: 4527–4528
- Hindu calendars
- Vikram Samvat: 823–824
- Shaka Samvat: 688–689
- Kali Yuga: 3867–3868
- Holocene calendar: 10767
- Iranian calendar: 145–146
- Islamic calendar: 149–150
- Japanese calendar: Tenpyō-jingo 3 / Jingo-keiun 1 (神護景雲元年)
- Javanese calendar: 661–662
- Julian calendar: 767; DCCLXVII
- Korean calendar: 3100
- Minguo calendar: 1145 before ROC 民前1145年
- Nanakshahi calendar: −701
- Seleucid era: 1078/1079 AG
- Thai solar calendar: 1309–1310
- Tibetan calendar: མེ་ཕོ་རྟ་ལོ་ (male Fire-Horse); 893 or 512 or −260 — to — མེ་མོ་ལུག་ལོ་ (female Fire-Sheep); 894 or 513 or −259

Year 767 (DCCLXVII) was a common year starting on Thursday of the Julian calendar, the 767th year of the Common Era (CE) and Anno Domini (AD) designations, the 767th year of the 1st millennium, the 67th year of the 8th century, and the 8th year of the 760s decade. The denomination 767 for this year has been used since the early medieval period, when the Anno Domini calendar era became the prevalent method in Europe for naming years.

== Events ==
=== By place ===
==== Byzantine Empire ====
- Byzantine–Bulgarian War: Emperor Constantine V invades Bulgaria across the Balkan Mountains, setting afire some settlements around the Bulgarian capital of Pliska. Constantine accepts a peace agreement with Pagan, the Bulgar ruler (khagan), whose land is in anarchy.

==== Europe ====
- The Franks, under King Pepin III ("the Short"), destroy resistance in central Aquitaine. They conquer the capital of Bordeaux, and devastate the whole region.
- Pepin III receives a Byzantine delegation at his court in Gentilly (southern suburbs of Paris). They discuss foreign policy regarding Italy, and Byzantine Iconoclasm.

==== Egypt ====
- The Bashmurian revolts continues in Egypt. A general revolt of the Delta takes place. The Egyptians joined with Arab settlers against the Abbasid government. Local officials were killed, and the governor Yazīd ibn Ḥātim sent a force against them, but it was defeated and forced to retreat to al-Fusṭāṭ.

==== Africa ====
- The Kharijite Berbers of Tlemcen and Tiaret try to conquer Ifriqiya from the Abbasid Caliphate, but fail to capture the capital of Kairouan (modern Tunisia).

=== By topic ===
==== Religion ====
- June 28 – Pope Paul I dies at Rome after a 10-year reign, in which he has protested against Constantine V's revival of Iconoclasm at Constantinople. He gives refuge to Greek monks who were expelled from the Byzantine Empire, and moves the relics of many saints from the catacombs to Roman churches. Duke Toto of Nepi has his layman brother elected to succeed Paul, under the name Constantine II.

== Births ==
- September 15 – Saichō, Japanese Buddhist monk (d. 822)
- Bishr al-Hafi, Muslim theologian (approximate date)
- Ja'far ibn Yahya, Persian vizier (d. 803)
- Muhammad ibn Idris al-Shafi`i, Muslim imam (d. 820)
- Pepin the Hunchback, son of Charlemagne (approximate date)

== Deaths ==
- April 20 – Taichō, Japanese Buddhist monk (b. 682)
- June 28 – Paul I, pope of the Catholic Church (b. 700)
- Abū Hanīfa, Muslim imam and scholar (b. 699)
- Aedh Ailghin, king of Uí Maine (Ireland)
- Constantine II, patriarch of Constantinople
- Ibn Ishaq, Muslim historian and hagiographer (or 761)
- Ibn Jurayj, Muslim scholar (approximate date)
- Muqatil ibn Sulayman, Muslim mufassir and theologian
- Murchad mac Flaithbertaig, chief of the Cenél Conaill
- Toktu, ruler (khagan) of the Bulgarian Empire

== Sources ==
- Brooks, E. W. (1913). "The Relations Between the Empire and Egypt from a New Arabic Source". Byzantinische Zeitschrift. 22 (2): 381–391. doi:10.1515/byzs.1913.22.2.381. S2CID 191661543.
- Megally, Mounir (1991). "Bashmuric Revolts". In Aziz Suryal Atiya (ed.). The Coptic Encyclopedia. Vol. 2. New York: Macmillan Publishers. cols. 349b–351b.
