= 764 =

Calendar year

764 in various calendars
Gregorian calendar	764; DCCLXIV
Ab urbe condita	1517
Armenian calendar	213; ԹՎ ՄԺԳ
Assyrian calendar	5514
Balinese saka calendar	685–686
Bengali calendar	170–171
Berber calendar	1714
Buddhist calendar	1308
Burmese calendar	126
Byzantine calendar	6272–6273
Chinese calendar	癸卯年 (Water Rabbit); 3461 or 3254 — to — 甲辰年 (Wood Dragon); 3462 or 3255
Coptic calendar	480–481
Discordian calendar	1930
Ethiopian calendar	756–757
Hebrew calendar	4524–4525
- Hindu calendars
Vikram Samvat	820–821
Shaka Samvat	685–686
Kali Yuga	3864–3865
Holocene calendar	10764
Iranian calendar	142–143
Islamic calendar	146–147
Japanese calendar	Tenpyō-hōji 8 (天平宝字８年)
Javanese calendar	658–659
Julian calendar	764; DCCLXIV
Korean calendar	3097
Minguo calendar	1148 before ROC 民前1148年
Nanakshahi calendar	−704
Seleucid era	1075/1076 AG
Thai solar calendar	1306–1307
Tibetan calendar	ཆུ་མོ་ཡོས་ལོ་ (female Water-Hare); 890 or 509 or −263 — to — ཤིང་ཕོ་འབྲུག་ལོ་ (male Wood-Dragon); 891 or 510 or −262

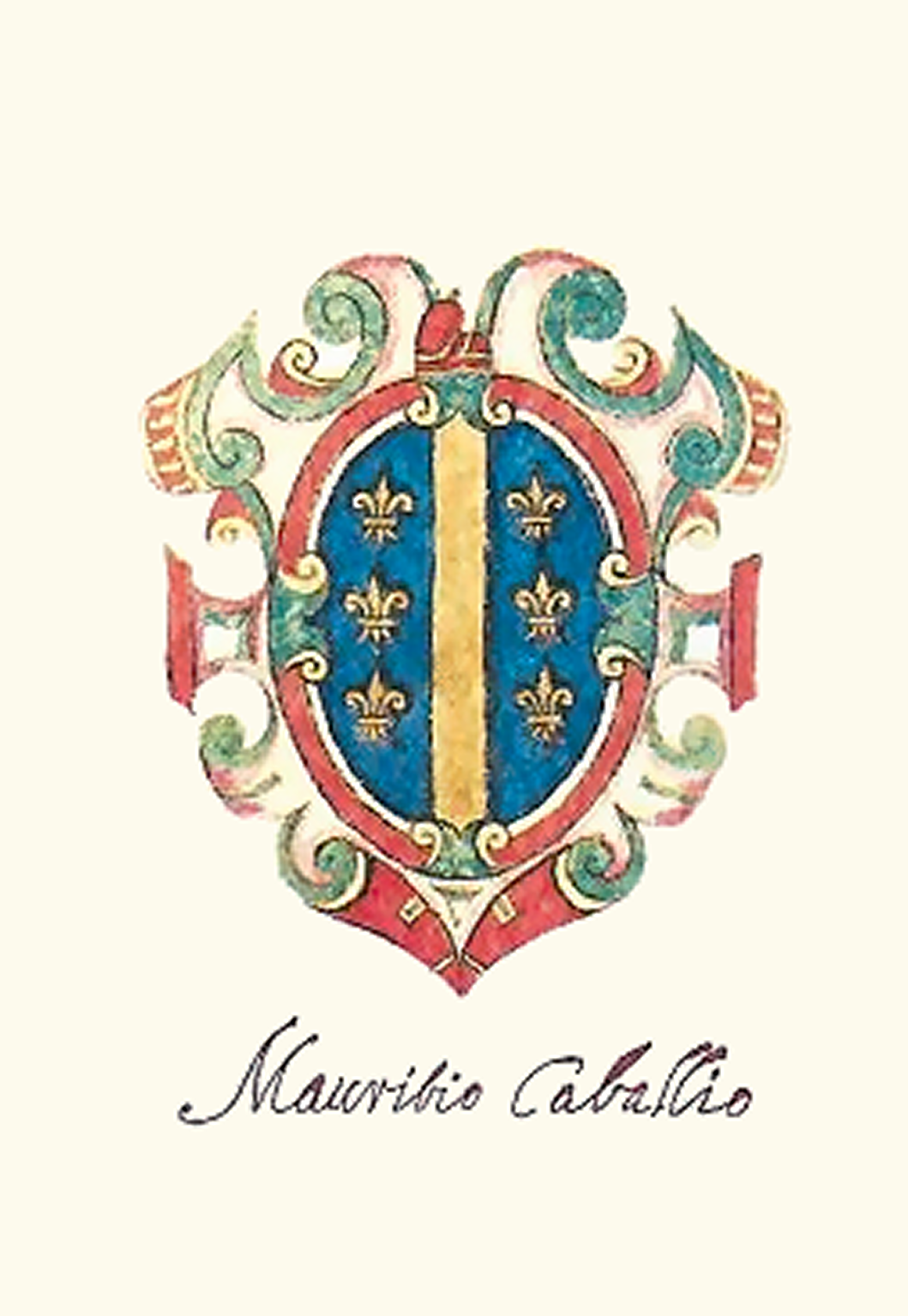
Coat of arms of doge Maurizio Galbaio

Year 764 (DCCLXIV) was a leap year starting on Sunday of the Julian calendar, the 764th year of the Common Era (CE) and Anno Domini (AD) designations, the 764th year of the 1st millennium, the 64th year of the 8th century, and the 5th year of the 760s decade. The denomination 764 for this year has been used since the early medieval period, when the Anno Domini calendar era became the prevalent method in Europe for naming years.

== Events ==
=== By place ===
==== Europe ====
- Domenico Monegario is deposed, after Pope Paul I demanded donations from Venice. Monegario is blinded and exiled, and succeeded by Maurizio Galbaio as the 7th doge of Venice. During his reign, Venetian wealth is increased via trade.

==== Britain ====
- King Offa of Mercia conquers Kent, and brings an end to the rule of kings Ealhmund and Sigered in West Kent. He imposes Mercian overlordship on the kingdom, but allows a local king, Heaberht, to rule there.

==== Asia ====
- October 14–21 – Fujiwara no Nakamaro Rebellion: A short-lived revolt led by Fujiwara no Nakamaro is suppressed. Emperor Junnin is deposed after a 6-year reign, and forced into exile. Former empress Kōken reassumes the imperial throne of Japan, and takes the name Shōtoku. She appoints her close associate, the priest Dōkyō, prime minister (taishi), running the government with him. Nakamaro is captured and killed with his wife and children.

=== By topic ===
==== Geography ====
- According to the historian Theophanes the Confessor, icebergs float past Constantinople from the Black Sea (approximate date).

==== Religion ====
- Cancor, a Frankish count (possibly of Hesbaye), founds Lorsch Abbey (modern-day Germany).

== Births ==
- Abu Thawr, Muslim scholar (d. 854)
- Al-Hadi, Muslim caliph (d. 786)
- Fujiwara no Nakanari, Japanese nobleman (d. 810)
- Li Jiang, chancellor of the Tang Dynasty (d. 830)
- Tian Hongzheng, general of the Tang Dynasty (d. 821)

== Deaths ==
- January 17 – Joseph of Freising, German bishop
- Arwa bint Mansur al-Himyari, wife of caliph al-Mansur.
- Abdallah ibn Ali, Muslim general
- Bregowine, archbishop of Canterbury
- Fujiwara no Nakamaro, Japanese statesman (b. 706)
- Stephen the Younger, Byzantine theologian (or 765)
