= Joseph Chailley =

French politician (1854–1928)

- Born: 4 March 1854; Saint-Florentin, Yonne, France
- Died: 9 November 1928 (aged 74); Paris, France
- Occupation: Politician
- Relatives: Paul Bert (father-in-law)

Letter by Chailley to Snouck Hurgronje (1913)

Joseph Chailley, also known as Joseph Chailley-Bert (1854–1928) was a French politician. He served as a member of the Chamber of Deputies for Vendée from 1906 to 1914. He was the founder and chairman of the French Colonial Union.

== Works ==
- Chailley-Bert, Joseph (1887). Paul Bert au Tonkin. Paris: G. Charpentier et cie. OCLC 22580334.
- Chailley-Bert, Joseph (1892). L'impôt sur le revenu : législation comparée et économie politique. Paris: Guillaumin. OCLC 763773480.
- Chailley-Bert, Joseph (1892). La Colonisation de l'Indochine : l'expérience anglaise. Paris: Colin. OCLC 419869739.
- Chailley-Bert, Joseph (1898). Les compagnies de colonisation sous l'ancien régime. Paris: Colin. OCLC 763920178.
- Chailley-Bert, Joseph (1898). L'Éducation et les colonies. Paris: Colin. OCLC 457423330.
- Chailley-Bert, Joseph (1898). Les Hollandais à Java. Rouen: Impr. E. Cagniard. OCLC 144614077.
- Chailley-Bert, Joseph (1910). L'Inde Britannique. Paris: Colin. OCLC 459174808.
