= Archives nationales d'outre-mer =

French state archive of materials related to the French colonial empire

The Archives nationales d'outre-mer (National Overseas Archives) in Aix-en-Provence is a branch of the Archives Nationales of France that documents the French colonial empire. According to one scholar, "half the history of France overseas was represented in the mass of papers" first assembled in Aix in 1966. The materials originated in various offices and repositories scattered throughout the colonies. The Dépôt des Archives d'Outre-Mer opened in 1966, and its successor, the Centre des Archives d'Outre-Mer, in 1987. It was later renamed the "Archives nationales d'outre-mer." Its facilities occupy a site near the Université de Provence Aix-Marseille I.

The archives groups its holdings by ministry, territory, document format (images, maps); it also has non-government materials. In 1986 the main national archives in Paris transferred to Aix its records of the "Section outre-mer." In 1995 the archives received substantial additional materials generated by colonial offices. Directors have included Martine Cornède (2007-2014) and Benoît Van Reeth (2014–present).^{(fr)}

The archives has published inventories of some of its records, including those related to the colonial administration of Algeria, French Equatorial Africa, and French Indochina; the governmental Secrétariat d'Etat à la Marine and Ministère des Colonies; bagnes (prisons); private organizations such as the Comité central français pour l'Outre-Mer; and individuals such as Madeleine de Lyée de Belleau, Léonce Jore, and Ho Chi Minh.

== Examples of items held in ANOM ==
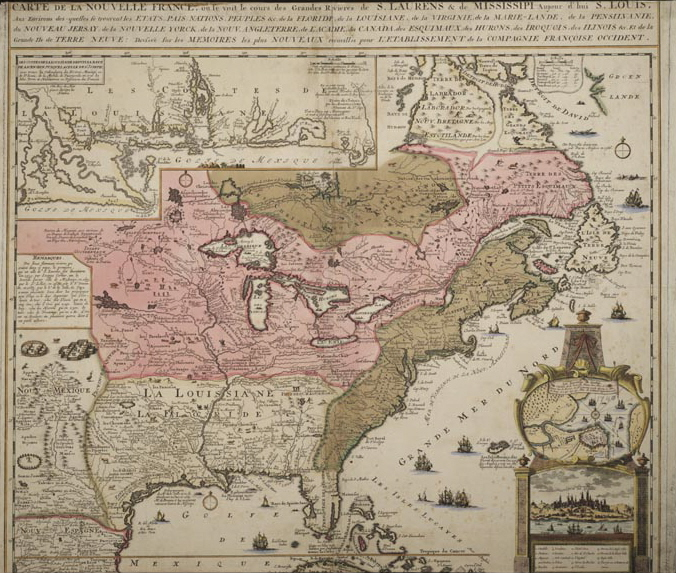
Lower Louisiana marked in yellow; pink represents Canada. Part of Canada below the great lakes was ceded to Louisiana in 1717. Brown represents British colonies. Original map from 1719

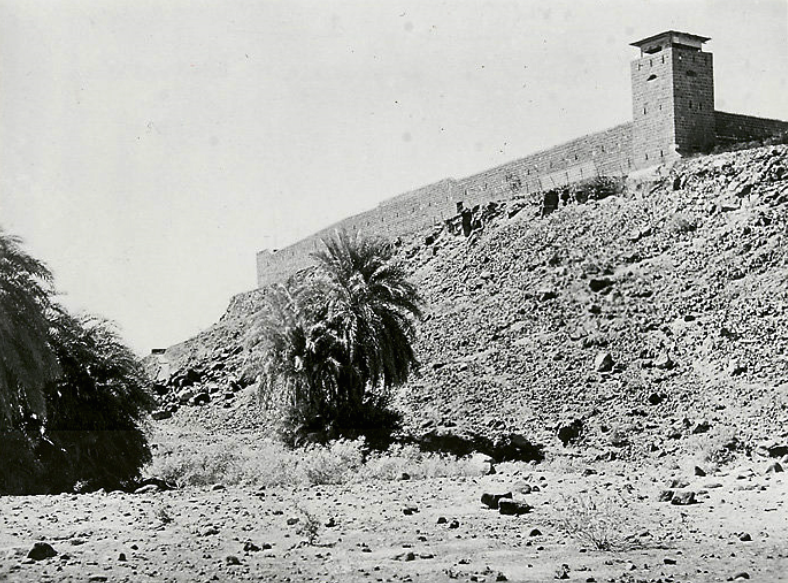
Dikkil fort, colonial French Somaliland, circa 1930s

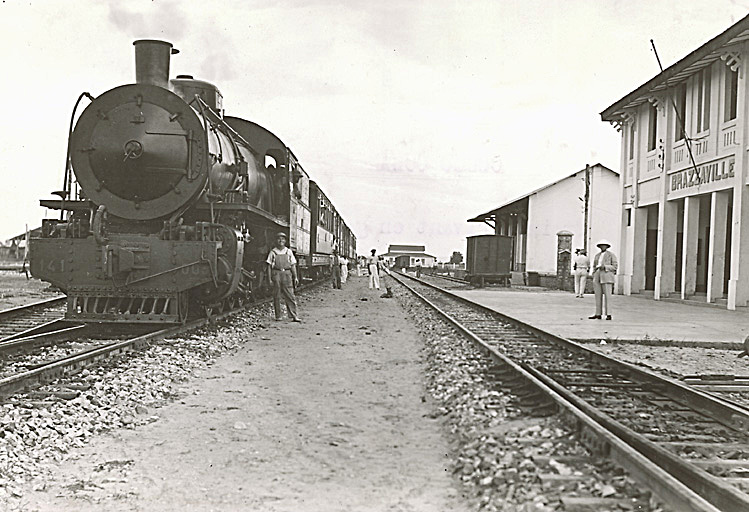
Congo-Ocean Railway, Brazzaville, 1932

== See also ==
- History of Overseas France
- List of French possessions and colonies
- Ministry of Overseas France

== Bibliography ==
In English

- Vincent Confer (1969). "Depot in Aix and Archival Sources for France Outre-Mer". French Historical Studies. 6 (1): 120–126. doi:10.2307/286248. JSTOR 286248.
- Gloria D. Westfall (1992). French Colonial Africa: A Guide to Official Sources. Zell. (Includes a chapter on ANOM)

In French

- Sylvie Clair (1988). "Le Centre des archives d'Outre-mer". Gazette des Archives (in French). 142 (142–143). Association des archivistes français: 5–17. doi:10.3406/gazar.1988.3099. ISSN 0016-5522 – via Persee.fr.
- Vincent Bouat (2009). "Les sources de l'histoire coloniale antérieures à 1815: le dépôt des papiers publics des colonies et le dépôt des fortifications des colonies: premiers fonds de l'institution coloniale française" [Sources of colonial history before 1815]. Afrique & Histoire (in French). 7 – via Cairn.info.
- Martine Cornède (2009). "Politique d'ouverture des fonds coloniaux". Afrique & Histoire (in French). 7 – via Cairn.info.
- Benoît Van Reeth, ed. (2017), Histoires d'outre-mer, les Archives nationales d'outre-mer ont 50 ans (in French), Somogy, ISBN 9782757212042 (+ contents)
