= French Colonial Union =

The French Colonial Union (French: Union coloniale française) was a group of French merchants established for the purpose of ensuring continued French colonialism, as well as solidifying their own commercial interests. It was founded in 1893 and published The Colonial Fortnightly (La Quinzaine coloniale). The French Colonial Union served as a pivotal colonial organization that greatly aided in commercial and foreign French affairs. Though from its initial establishment, the French Colonial Union was never major, its members set out with a mindset of expressing its ideas, being vocal, and then placing those ideas into reality. The foundations of the French Colonial Union displayed an organization that was focused on change and advancement. The success of the French Colonial Union would directly influence the French colonies, and how France dealt with them.

== Membership and inclusion into the Union process ==
The French Colonial Union's policy on membership was that it would not accept new members for the sake of numbers. The French Colonial Union's goal was not to increase its numbers, but to increase its influence and impact through action not population. A few of its most prominent members include the first French Colonial President Emile Mercet and the Secretary General, for about twenty years, Joseph Chailley-Bert, one of the union's most determined and prominent members. Others members include Jules Le Cesne, Paul Doumer, Noel Auricoste, and Ulysse Pila, among many other well-known figures of society from the times.

== Basic guidelines ==
The close relationship between the French Colonial Union and the colonies tied its fate directly to any and all things it managed to achieve. The lack of support from “large industry and capital” necessitated an alternate means of seeking support by the Union. As in any new organization, popular and well-known associates will help bolster your influence and your appearance to the general public. By not being able to secure many of these larger scale backers, the French Colonial Union was not as potent nor nearly as authoritative as it could have been. The Union instead had to rely on less-influential commercial businesses to add to its resume and empower its impact. This was an unfortunate flaw of the French Colonial Union, because it greatly hampered its power whenever the Union voiced its views. One positive was that by having such a strong-minded figure as Chailley-Bert in its offices, the French Colonial Union was able to remain a figure among reform and colonial affairs.

== French Colonial Union in action ==
French foreign policies in its colonies such as Africa remained a headline in French Colonial Union news namely due to Chailley-Bert's persistence to keep the Union on top of France's foreign affairs. By involving itself in these affairs and addressing various aspects of France's colonies, like Africa or Algeria, the French Colonial Union was able to put its voice and influence on the issues. Basically by following the Union's guidelines in order for France to prosper in the future, it was necessary that it invest considerable time, the appropriate funds and effort into its colonies if it were to obtain greater satisfaction with its colonies. This makes much sense, being that France would be more likely to fail with its colonies if it did not attempt to follow up the acquisitions with firm decisions and laws.

== Improvement over the current standards ==
Chailley-Bert often took sides on issues in order to draw attention to them, or ensure that they were or would be considered for change. His position on business with certain aspects of African industries proved a bonus for France, as it would eventually be able to retain a portion of France's African possession in the future. Other issues that received change included Algeria, to where Chailley-Bert also had ties due to a trip he had previously taken into the colony. In engaging in various colonial affairs, Chailley-Bert was able to add the French Colonial Union's influence on the matter. Individual members involving themselves in different affairs such as the African economic situation gave the French Colonial Union reason to express its grievances and concerns.

== Impact and effects of the French Colonial Union ==
Throughout its storied yet brief existence, the French Colonial Union was able to achieve small successes in various avenues. From issues in Africa to Algeria and several other victories, the Union was able to alter the perspectives of enough people to necessitate change. By consistently focusing, targeting, and analyzing different colonial situations, it was able to garner enough notice to the issue that change or at least possibility for change was considered. The Union was not a long lasting organization but in the time that it was operational, the French Colonial Union played a significant factor in France's colonial affairs. It was evident that through the actions of the French Colonial Union, its guidelines were designed for progress not regress, even if that goal was not entirely obtained. The hard work of many of its members such as Joseph Chailley-Bert, ensured that the Union would remain on the proper path to increasing France's colonial possessions' worth.

Indeed, the Union Coloniale Francaise (UCF) organized five hundred talks between 1897 and 1906 with the intention of promoting the emigration of bons colons or "good colonists" to French colonial destinations, and in the case of French colonial IndoChina, as noted by historian Marie Paule Ha, among the benefits of including women as colonists was the charge of putting an end to the “highly undesirable practice of concubinage between Frenchmen and native women,” and an unloading of the large “stock” of metropolitan single females.

== Variant names ==
- Union coloniale française, est. 1893
- Comité de l'Empire français, from early 1940s-?
- Comité central de la France d'Outre-mer (CCFOM), from 1948-?
- Comité central français pour l'Outre-mer
- Comité du rayonnement français, pre-1998

== See also ==
- Minister of Overseas France
- Algeria
- French colonial empires
- List of French possessions and colony

== Bibliography ==
issued by the union

- Bulletin de l'Union coloniale française, Paris, circa 1890s

about the union

- "Editorial Notes". Journal of the Royal African Society. 18 (72): 311–315. July 1919. ISSN 0368-4016. JSTOR 716044.
- C. M. Andrew, A. S. Kanya-Forstner. The French 'Colonial Party': Its Composition, Aims and Influence, 1885-1914. The Historical Journal, Vol. 14, No. 1 (Mar., 1971), pp. 99–128
- Persell, Stuart M. "Joseph Chailley-Bert And the Importance of the Union Coloniale Française." The Historical Journal, XVII, I 1974: 176-184.
- C. M. Andrew, A. S. Kanya-Forstner. French Business and the French Colonialists. The Historical Journal, Vol. 19, No. 4 (Dec., 1976), pp. 981–1000
- Archives du Comité central français pour l'Outre-mer (in French). Aix: Centre des archives d'outre-mer. 1999. ISBN 2860002677.
- Ha, Marie-Paule. French Women and the Empire: The Case of Indochina. Oxford, UK and New York: Oxford University Press, 2014.
