= 771 =

Calendar year

771 in various calendars
Gregorian calendar	771; DCCLXXI
Ab urbe condita	1524
Armenian calendar	220; ԹՎ ՄԻ
Assyrian calendar	5521
Balinese saka calendar	692–693
Bengali calendar	177–178
Berber calendar	1721
Buddhist calendar	1315
Burmese calendar	133
Byzantine calendar	6279–6280
Chinese calendar	庚戌年 (Metal Dog); 3468 or 3261 — to — 辛亥年 (Metal Pig); 3469 or 3262
Coptic calendar	487–488
Discordian calendar	1937
Ethiopian calendar	763–764
Hebrew calendar	4531–4532
- Hindu calendars
Vikram Samvat	827–828
Shaka Samvat	692–693
Kali Yuga	3871–3872
Holocene calendar	10771
Iranian calendar	149–150
Islamic calendar	154–155
Japanese calendar	Hōki 2 (宝亀２年)
Javanese calendar	665–666
Julian calendar	771; DCCLXXI
Korean calendar	3104
Minguo calendar	1141 before ROC 民前1141年
Nanakshahi calendar	−697
Seleucid era	1082/1083 AG
Thai solar calendar	1313–1314
Tibetan calendar	ལྕགས་ཕོ་ཁྱི་ལོ་ (male Iron-Dog); 897 or 516 or −256 — to — ལྕགས་མོ་ཕག་ལོ་ (female Iron-Boar); 898 or 517 or −255

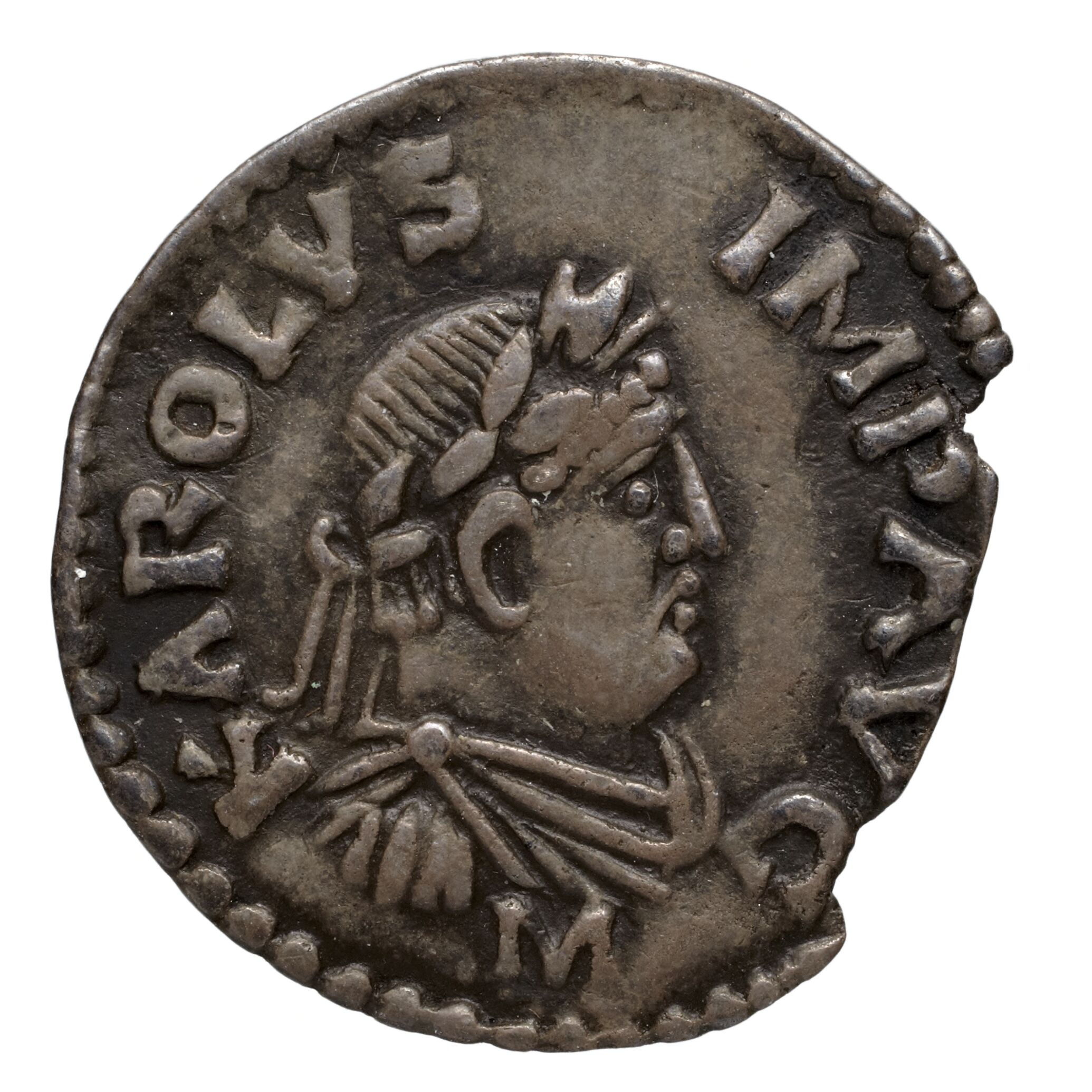
Coin of Charlemagne (Carolus Magnus)

The year 771 (DCCLXXI) was a common year starting on Tuesday of the Julian calendar. The denomination 771 for this year has been used since the early medieval period, when the Anno Domini calendar era became the prevalent method in Europe for naming years.

== Events ==
=== By place ===
==== Europe ====
- December 4 – King Carloman I, youngest son of Pepin III ("the Short"), dies (of a severe nosebleed, according to one source) at the Villa of Samoussy, leaving his brother Charlemagne sole ruler of the now reunified Frankish Kingdom. Gerberga, the widow of Carloman, flees with her two sons to the court of King Desiderius of the Lombards, at Pavia.
- Charlemagne repudiates his Lombard wife Desiderata, daughter of Desiderius, after one year of marriage. He marries the 13-year-old Swabian girl Hildegard, who will bear him nine children. Desiderius, furious at Charlemagne, plans a punitive campaign against the Franks and Rome.
- King Offa of Mercia defeats the Haestingas, and joins their little region to his sub-kingdom of Sussex.

==== Americas ====
- January 24 – Kʼakʼ Tiliw Chan Yopaat dedicates a 65-ton stele, the largest stone known to be quarried by the Maya civilization, at his city of Quiriguá.

== Births ==
- Al-Hakam I, Muslim emir of Córdoba (d. 822)
- Ubaydallah ibn al-Mahdi, Abbasid prince and politician (d. 810)
- Constantine VI, emperor of the Byzantine Empire (d. 797)

== Deaths ==
- December 4 – Carloman I, king of the Franks (b. 751)
- Coirpre mac Fogartaig, king of Brega (Ireland)
- Fujiwara no Nagate, Japanese nobleman (b. 714)
- Approximate date – Amir Kror Suri, also known as Jahan Pahlawan, legendary character in Pashtun history
