= 822 =

Calendar year

822 in various calendars
Gregorian calendar	822; DCCCXXII
Ab urbe condita	1575
Armenian calendar	271; ԹՎ ՄՀԱ
Assyrian calendar	5572
Balinese saka calendar	743–744
Bengali calendar	228–229
Berber calendar	1772
Buddhist calendar	1366
Burmese calendar	184
Byzantine calendar	6330–6331
Chinese calendar	辛丑年 (Metal Ox); 3519 or 3312 — to — 壬寅年 (Water Tiger); 3520 or 3313
Coptic calendar	538–539
Discordian calendar	1988
Ethiopian calendar	814–815
Hebrew calendar	4582–4583
- Hindu calendars
Vikram Samvat	878–879
Shaka Samvat	743–744
Kali Yuga	3922–3923
Holocene calendar	10822
Iranian calendar	200–201
Islamic calendar	206–207
Japanese calendar	Kōnin 13 (弘仁１３年)
Javanese calendar	718–719
Julian calendar	822; DCCCXXII
Korean calendar	3155
Minguo calendar	1090 before ROC 民前1090年
Nanakshahi calendar	−646
Seleucid era	1133/1134 AG
Thai solar calendar	1364–1365
Tibetan calendar	阴金牛年 (female Iron-Ox); 948 or 567 or −205 — to — 阳水虎年 (male Water-Tiger); 949 or 568 or −204

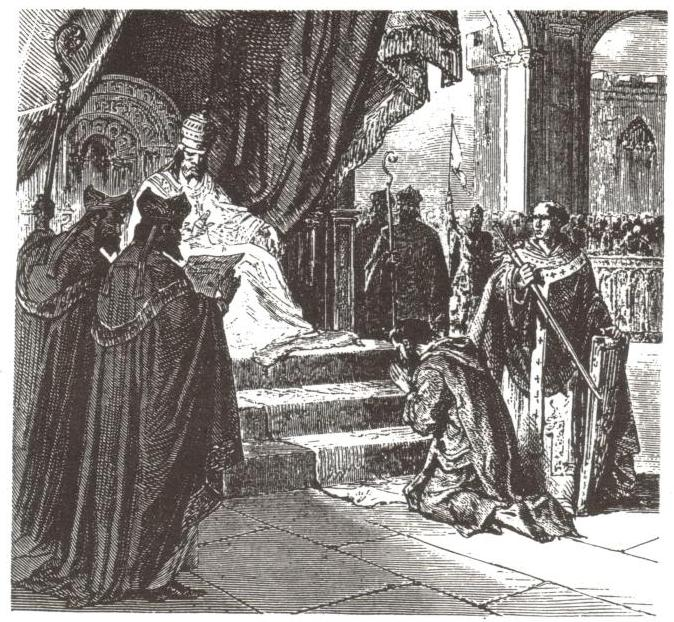
Emperor Louis I doing penance at Attigny

Year 822 (DCCCXXII) was a common year starting on Wednesday of the Julian calendar.

== Events ==
=== By place ===
==== Byzantine Empire ====
- Byzantine general and usurper Thomas the Slav continues his revolt against Emperor Michael II. He unsuccessfully besieges Constantinople, while his fleet is destroyed by Michael's fleet, using Greek fire.
- Battle of Kedouktos (near Heraclea): Khan Omurtag of Bulgaria sends a relief army, and defeats the Byzantine rebels.

==== Europe ====
- Emperor Louis I performs public penance for causing his nephew Bernard's death 4 years earlier, at his palace of Attigny (Ardennes), before Pope Paschal I, and the Frankish nobles (this to restore harmony and re-establish his authority).
- The earliest known mention of the Serbs, in Einhard's Royal Frankish Annals.

==== Britain ====
- King Ceolwulf I of Mercia invades Powys (Wales), but is beaten back by King Cyngen. However, Ceolwulf does destroy the fortress of Deganwy, and later takes the kingdom under his control (approximate date).

==== Al-Andalus ====
- Al-Hakam I, Umayyad emir of Córdoba, dies after a 26-year reign. He is succeeded by his son Abd al-Rahman II, who begins a military campaign against King Alfonso II of Asturias in Al-Andalus (modern Spain).

==== Asia ====
- Kim Hŏn-ch'ang launches a short-lived rebellion in Silla, which gains control over much of the southern and western Korean Peninsula.

==== Central America ====
- February 6 – Ukit Took becomes the last ruler (ajaw) of the Mayan city-state Copán (modern Guatemala). After his death in 830, the kingdom is wiped out, most likely from an epidemic.

=== By topic ===
==== Religion ====
- Rabanus Maurus, a Frankish Benedictine monk, becomes abbot of Fulda, after the death of Eigil.

== Births ==
- Al-Mutawakkil, Muslim caliph (d. 861)
- Ibn Abi Asim, Muslim Sunni scholar (or 821)
- Minamoto no Tōru, Japanese poet (d. 895)
- Xuefeng Yicun, Chinese Chan master (d. 908)

== Deaths ==
- June 26 – Saichō, Japanese Buddhist monk (b. 767)
- Al-Hakam I, Muslim emir of Córdoba (b. 771)
- Al-Waqidi, Muslim historian and biographer
- Denebeorht, bishop of Worcester
- Eigil of Fulda, Bavarian abbot
- Gregory Pterotos, Byzantine general (strategos)
- Kim Hŏn-ch'ang, Silla aristocrat and rebel leader
- Li Yijian, chancellor of the Tang Dynasty (b. 756)
- Tahir ibn Husayn, founder of the Tahirid Dynasty
- Tian Bu, general of the Tang Dynasty (b. 785)
- Winiges, duke of Spoleto (Italy)
