= 706 =

Calendar year

706 in various calendars
- Gregorian calendar: 706; DCCVI
- Ab urbe condita: 1459
- Armenian calendar: 155; ԹՎ ՃԾԵ
- Assyrian calendar: 5456
- Balinese saka calendar: 627–628
- Bengali calendar: 112–113
- Berber calendar: 1656
- Buddhist calendar: 1250
- Burmese calendar: 68
- Byzantine calendar: 6214–6215
- Chinese calendar: 乙巳年 (Wood Snake); 3403 or 3196 — to — 丙午年 (Fire Horse); 3404 or 3197
- Coptic calendar: 422–423
- Discordian calendar: 1872
- Ethiopian calendar: 698–699
- Hebrew calendar: 4466–4467
- Hindu calendars
- Vikram Samvat: 762–763
- Shaka Samvat: 627–628
- Kali Yuga: 3806–3807
- Holocene calendar: 10706
- Iranian calendar: 84–85
- Islamic calendar: 87–88
- Japanese calendar: Keiun 3 (慶雲３年)
- Javanese calendar: 598–599
- Julian calendar: 706; DCCVI
- Korean calendar: 3039
- Minguo calendar: 1206 before ROC 民前1206年
- Nanakshahi calendar: −762
- Seleucid era: 1017/1018 AG
- Thai solar calendar: 1248–1249
- Tibetan calendar: ཤིང་མོ་སྦྲུལ་ལོ་ (female Wood-Snake); 832 or 451 or −321 — to — མེ་ཕོ་རྟ་ལོ་ (male Fire-Horse); 833 or 452 or −320

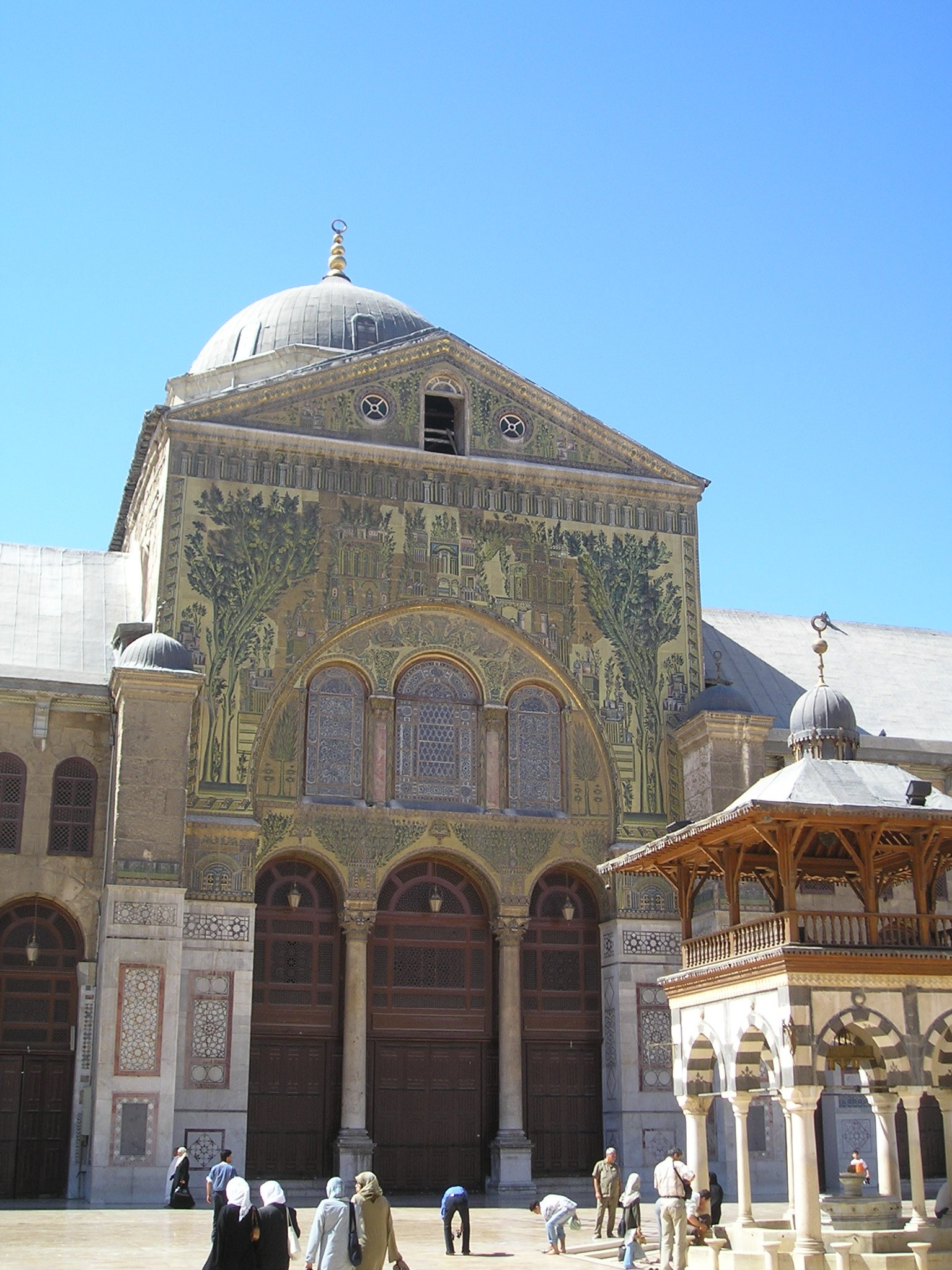
The Great Mosque of Damascus (Syria)

Year 706 (DCCVI) was a common year starting on Friday of the Julian calendar, the 706th year of the Common Era (CE) and Anno Domini (AD) designations, the 706th year of the 1st millennium, the 6th year of the 8th century, and the 7th year of the 700s decade. The denomination 706 for this year has been used since the early medieval period, when the Anno Domini calendar era became the prevalent method in Europe for naming years.

== Events ==
=== By place ===
==== Byzantine Empire ====
- February 15 – Emperor Justinian II presides over the public humiliation of his predecessors, Leontios and Tiberios III, and their chief associates in the Hippodrome of Constantinople, after which they are executed. Patriarch Kallinikos I is also deposed, blinded and exiled to Rome, and succeeded by Kyros.

==== Europe ====
- Duke Corvulus of Friuli is arrested by King Aripert II of the Lombards, and has his eyes gouged out. He is replaced by Pemmo, who begins a war against the Slavs of Carinthia (modern Austria).

==== China ====
- July 2 – Emperor Zhong Zong has the remains of his mother and recently deceased ruling empress Wu Zetian, her son Li Xian, her grandson Li Chongrun, and granddaughter Li Xianhui, all interred in the same tomb complex as his father and Wu Zetian's husband Gao Zong, outside Chang'an, known as the Qianling Mausoleum, located on Mount Liang, which will then remain unopened until 1960.

=== By topic ===
==== Religion ====
- Berhtwald, archbishop of Canterbury, is obliged by the pope's insistence to call the Synod of Nidd (Northumbria).
- Caliph Al-Walid I commissions the construction of the Great Mosque of Damascus (Syria).

== Births ==
- Al-Walid II, Muslim caliph (d. 744)
- Eoppa, king of Wessex (d. 781)
- Fujiwara no Nakamaro, Japanese statesman (d. 764)
- Han Gan, Chinese painter (d. 783)
- Theudoald, nephew of the Frankish ruler Charles Martel (d. 741)

== Deaths ==
- February 15 – Leontios, Byzantine emperor
- February 15 – Tiberios III, Byzantine emperor
- Gisulf I, duke of Benevento
- Kallinikos I, patriarch of Constantinople (or 705)
- Shenxiu, Chinese Zen Buddhist patriarch
- Zhang Jianzhi, official of the Tang dynasty (b. 625)
