= Tenpyō-jingo =

Period of Japanese history (765–767)

Tenpyō-jingo (天平神護) was a Japanese era name (年号, nengō, lit. "year name") after Tenpyō-hōji and before Jingo-keiun. This period spanned the years from January 765 through August 767. The reigning empress was Empress Shōtoku (称徳天皇). This was the same woman who had reigned previously as Empress Kōken (孝謙天皇).

== Change of era ==
- 765 Tenpyō-jingo gannen (天平神護元年): The new era name was created to mark an event or series of events. The previous era ended and the new one commenced in Tenpyō-hōji 9, on the 7th day of the 1st month of 765.

== Events of the Tenpyō-jingo era ==
- 765 (Tenpyō-jingo 1, 2nd month): The empress raised the Buddhist priest Dōkyō to the position of Daijō-daijin.
- 765 (Tenpyō-jingo 1): The udaijin Fujiwara no Toyonari died at age 62.
- 766 (Tenpyō-jingo 2, 1st month): Fujiwara no Matate is named udaijin; and Kibi no Makibi becomes dainagon.

== Notes ==
Preceded by Tenpyō-hōji	Era or nengō Tenpyō-jingo; 765–767	Succeeded by Jingo-keiun
