= 625 =

Calendar year

625 in various calendars
Gregorian calendar	625; DCXXV
Ab urbe condita	1378
Armenian calendar	74; ԹՎ ՀԴ
Assyrian calendar	5375
Balinese saka calendar	546–547
Bengali calendar	31–32
Berber calendar	1575
Buddhist calendar	1169
Burmese calendar	−13
Byzantine calendar	6133–6134
Chinese calendar	甲申年 (Wood Monkey); 3322 or 3115 — to — 乙酉年 (Wood Rooster); 3323 or 3116
Coptic calendar	341–342
Discordian calendar	1791
Ethiopian calendar	617–618
Hebrew calendar	4385–4386
- Hindu calendars
Vikram Samvat	681–682
Shaka Samvat	546–547
Kali Yuga	3725–3726
Holocene calendar	10625
Iranian calendar	3–4
Islamic calendar	3–4
Japanese calendar	N/A
Javanese calendar	515–516
Julian calendar	625; DCXXV
Korean calendar	2958
Minguo calendar	1287 before ROC 民前1287年
Nanakshahi calendar	−843
Seleucid era	936/937 AG
Thai solar calendar	1167–1168
Tibetan calendar	ཤིང་ཕོ་སྤྲེ་ལོ་ (male Wood-Monkey); 751 or 370 or −402 — to — ཤིང་མོ་བྱ་ལོ་ (female Wood-Bird); 752 or 371 or −401

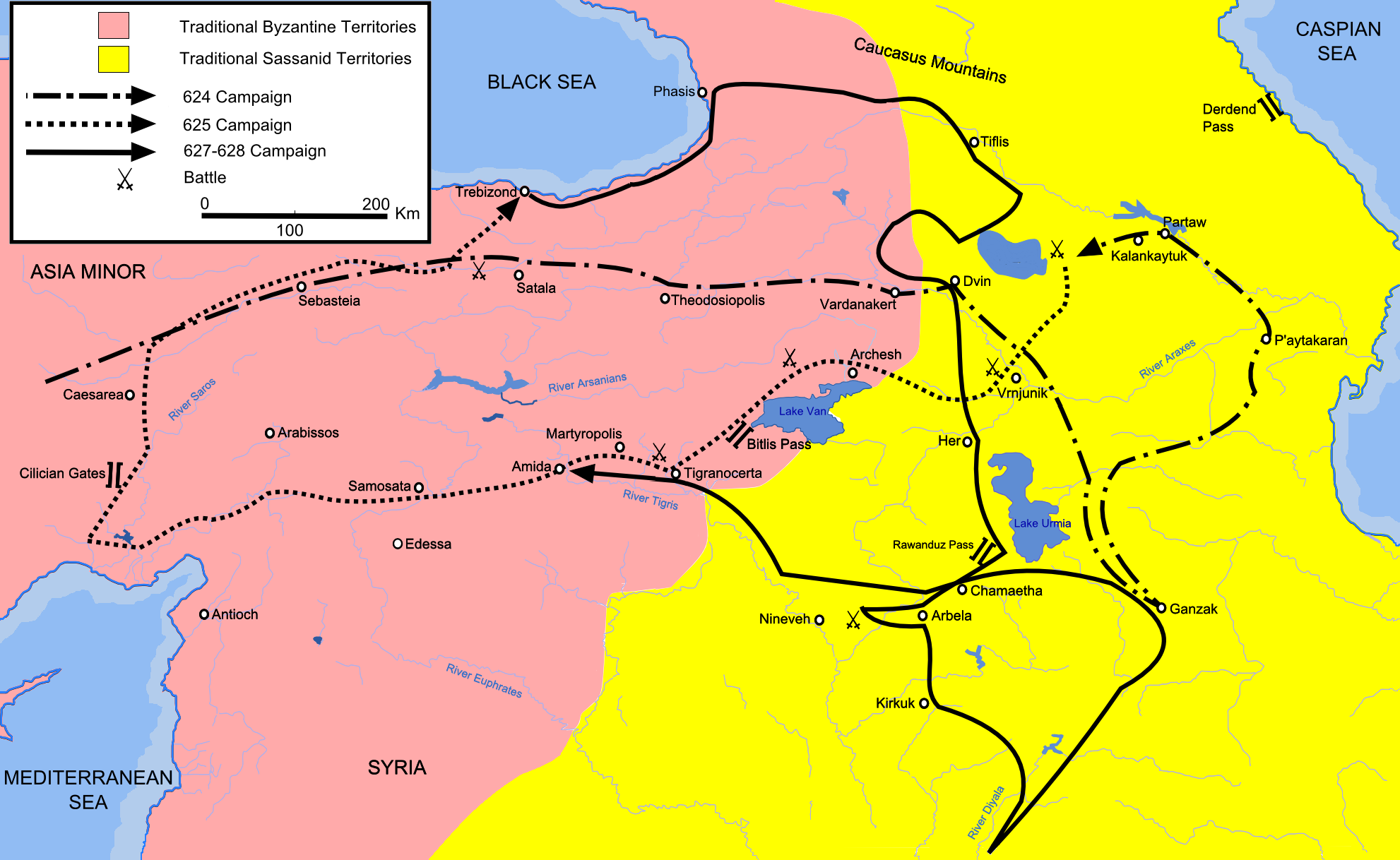
Campaign of Heraclius in Armenia and Anatolia

Year 625 (DCXXV) was a common year starting on Tuesday of the Julian calendar. The denomination 625 for this year has been used since the early medieval period, when the Anno Domini calendar era became the prevalent method in Europe for naming years.

== Events ==
=== By place ===
==== Byzantine Empire ====
- Byzantine–Sassanid War: Emperor Heraclius marches with his forces westward, through the mountains of Corduene. The Persians go into winter quarters nearby, but Heraclius attacks them at Tigranakert (Kingdom of Armenia), routing the forces of the generals Shahin Vahmanzadegan and Shahraplakan. In less than seven days, he bypasses Mount Ararat and captures the strategic fortresses of Amida along the Arsanias River, and Martyropolis on the upper Tigris. The Persian army in northern Mesopotamia withdraws westward across the Euphrates. Heraclius pursues into Cilicia, accompanied by a great train of booty.
- Battle of Sarus: Heraclius is victorious in a Byzantine assault river crossing. The reinforced Persians under Shahrbaraz are defeated along the Sarus River, near Adana (modern Turkey). Heraclius recaptures Cappadocia and Pontus, and returns to Trapezus to spend the winter. Shahrbaraz retreats in good order, and is able to continue his advance through Asia Minor towards Constantinople.

==== Britain ====
- King Edwin of Northumbria marries Æthelburga of Kent. As a Christian, she brings her personal chaplain, Paulinus, and encourages her husband to convert to Christianity.
- King Cadfan of Gwynedd dies and is buried at Llangadwaladr, where his memorial stone can still be seen. He is succeeded by his son Cadwallon (approximate date).
- Judicaël becomes high king of Domnonée (northern Brittany).

==== Asia ====
- King Pulakeshin II of Chalukya receives Persian envoys, who are sent by King Khosrau II at Badami (southern India).

=== By topic ===
==== Religion ====
- March 19 – Battle of Uhud: Muhammad retreats against the inhabitants of Mecca (Saudi Arabia), which they consider a victory.
- October 25 – Pope Boniface V dies at Rome after a 6-year reign. He is succeeded by Honorius I as the 70th pope.

== Births ==
- Hasan ibn Ali, grandson of Muhammad (d. 670)
- Œthelwald, king of Deira (approximate date)
- Theodo II, duke of Bavaria (approximate date)
- Zhang Jianzhi, official of the Tang dynasty (d. 706)

== Deaths ==
- October 25 – Pope Boniface V
- Abd-Allah ibn Jahsh, Arab sahabah
- Hamza ibn Abd al-Muttalib, Arab sahabah
- Cadfan ap Iago, king of Gwynedd
