= Jingo-keiun =

Period of Japanese history (767–770 CE)

Jingo-keiun (神護景雲) was a Japanese era name (年号, nengō, "year name") after Tenpyō-jingo and before Hōki. This period spanned the years from August 767 through October 770. The reigning empress was Empress Shōtoku-tennō (称徳天皇). This was the same woman who had reigned previously as the former Kōken-tennō (孝謙天皇).

== Change of era ==
- 767 Jingo-keiun gannen (神護景雲元年): The new era name was created to mark an event or series of events. The previous era ended and the new one commenced in Tenpyō-jingo 3, on the 18th day of the 8th month of 767.

== Events of the Jingo-keiun era ==
- 8 September 769 (Jingo-keiun 3, 4th day of the 8th month): In the 5th year of Shōtoku-tennō's reign (称徳天皇5年), the empress died; and she designated Senior Counselor Prince Shirakabe as her heir.
- 770 (Jingo-keiun 3, 4th day of the 8th month): The succession (senso) was received by a 62-year-old grandson of Emperor Tenji.
- 770 (Jingo-keiun 3, 1st day of the 10th month): Emperor Kōnin was said to have acceded to the throne (sokui) in a formal ceremony;and the nengō was changed to Hōki on the very same day.

The Jingō-kaihō' was a copper coin issued from 765 to 796. It had a diameter of about 23 mm and a weight of between 3.4 and 4.5 grams.

== See also ==
- Wadōkaichin

== Notes ==
Preceded by Tenpyō-jingo	Era or nengō Jingo-keiun; 767–770	Succeeded by Hōki
