= 714 =

Calendar year

714 in various calendars
- Gregorian calendar: 714; DCCXIV
- Ab urbe condita: 1467
- Armenian calendar: 163; ԹՎ ՃԿԳ
- Assyrian calendar: 5464
- Balinese saka calendar: 635–636
- Bengali calendar: 120–121
- Berber calendar: 1664
- Buddhist calendar: 1258
- Burmese calendar: 76
- Byzantine calendar: 6222–6223
- Chinese calendar: 癸丑年 (Water Ox); 3411 or 3204 — to — 甲寅年 (Wood Tiger); 3412 or 3205
- Coptic calendar: 430–431
- Discordian calendar: 1880
- Ethiopian calendar: 706–707
- Hebrew calendar: 4474–4475
- Hindu calendars
- Vikram Samvat: 770–771
- Shaka Samvat: 635–636
- Kali Yuga: 3814–3815
- Holocene calendar: 10714
- Iranian calendar: 92–93
- Islamic calendar: 95–96
- Japanese calendar: Wadō 7 (和銅７年)
- Javanese calendar: 607–608
- Julian calendar: 714; DCCXIV
- Korean calendar: 3047
- Minguo calendar: 1198 before ROC 民前1198年
- Nanakshahi calendar: −754
- Seleucid era: 1025/1026 AG
- Thai solar calendar: 1256–1257
- Tibetan calendar: ཆུ་མོ་གླང་ལོ་ (female Water-Ox); 840 or 459 or −313 — to — ཤིང་ཕོ་སྟག་ལོ་ (male Wood-Tiger); 841 or 460 or −312

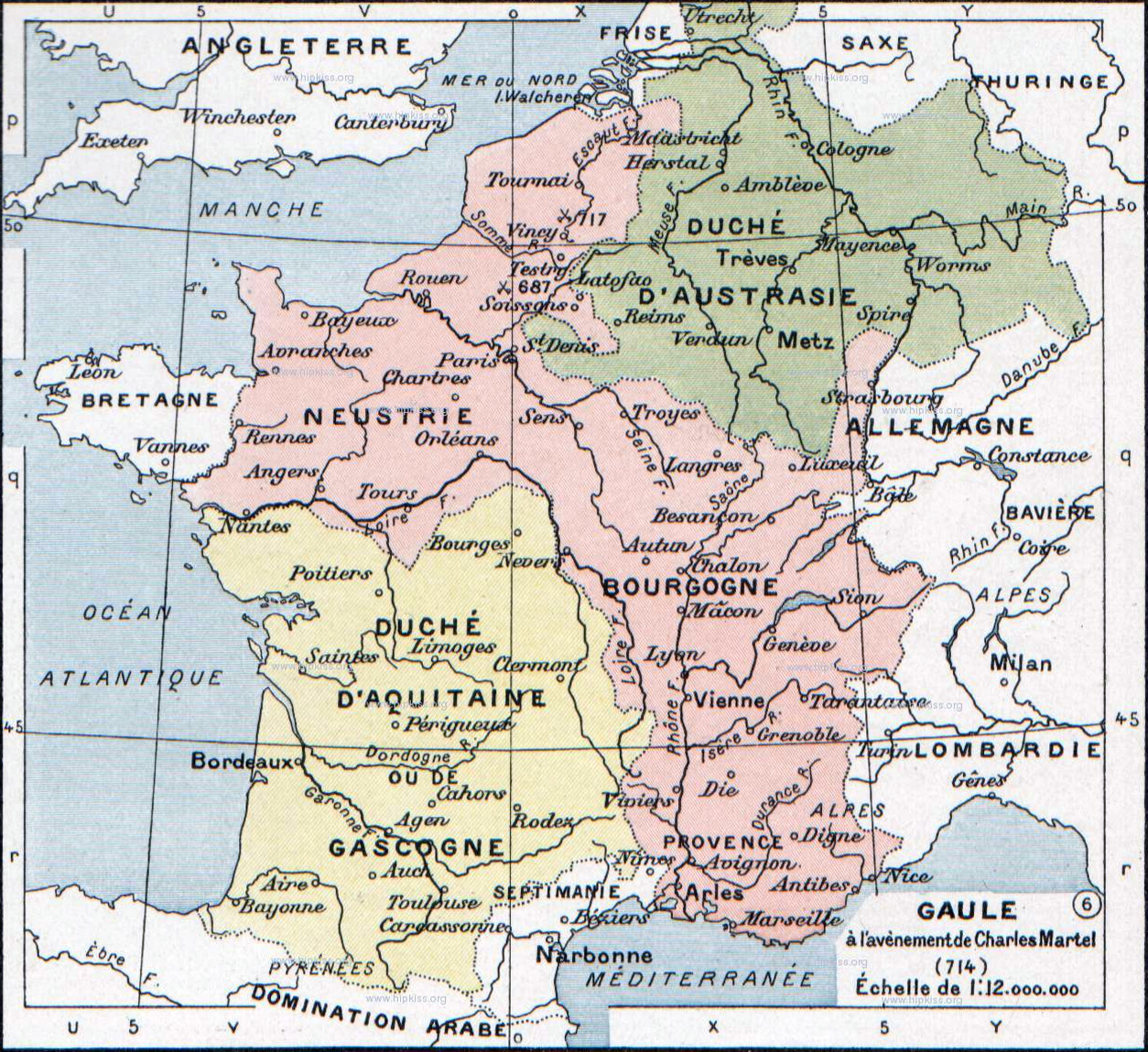
Francia at the death of Pepin II (of Herstal)

Year 714 (DCCXIV) was a common year starting on Monday of the Julian calendar. The denomination 714 for this year has been used since the early medieval period, when the Anno Domini calendar era became the prevalent method in Europe for naming years.

== Events ==
=== By place ===
==== Europe ====
- In Septimania, local Visigothic nobles of the anti-Roderick party are offered peace terms similar to those of Prince Theodemir (see 713), and accept Muslim overlordship. Other Visigoths revolt and proclaim Ardo as king. Visigothic refugees gather in the Picos de Europa in the mountains of Asturias.
- December 16 – Pepin II (of Herstal), mayor of the Merovingian palace, dies at Jupille (modern Belgium). His grandson Theudoald (who at age eight was still well into early childhood) becomes the nominal mayor of the palace, while his wife Plectrude holds actual power and imprisons Pepin's illegitimate son Charles Martel.
- Civil War within the Pepinid clan: A revolt erupts between the Neustrian Franks and Frisians. King Radbod forces bishop Willibrord and his Benedictine monks to flee, and advances as far as Cologne (Germany). Frisia (modern-day Netherlands) once again becomes independent.
- Duke Eudes proclaims himself the independent prince of Aquitaine (located north-east of the Garonne River), thereby asserting legal as well as practical independence from the Frankish Kingdom.
- Grimoald the Younger, mayor of the palace of Neustria, is assassinated while on pilgrimage to visit the tomb of Saint Lambert at Liège, on orders of his father-in-law King Radbod.

==== Arabian Empire ====
- Umayyad conquest of Hispania: Continuing campaigns of Muslim domination of the Iberian Peninsula. Arab forces raid the valley of the Ebro River, and capture the fortress city of Zaragoza. Musa ibn Nusayr is made protector (wali) of Al-Andalus, with his capital at Seville (approximate date).
- Tariq ibn Ziyad conquers the cities of Barcelona and Narbonne, where Visigothic nobles accept Umayyad overlordship, in return for autonomy in Septimania (Southern France). Muslims also raid Avignon and Lyon (approximate date).
- Musa ibn Nusayr and Tariq ibn Ziyad are summoned back to Damascus by caliph Al-Walid I. They are ordered to deliver all the spoils of war. Musa complains and is stripped of his rank. Abd al-Aziz, son of Musa, becomes governor of Al-Andalus (modern Spain).
- Al-Hajjaj ibn Yusuf, governor of Mesopotamia, dies at Wasit (Iraq) after a 20-year administration. He is credited for improving agricultural production and introducing the diacritic points to the Arabic script. Al-Hajjaj convinces Al-Walid I to adopt an Arab currency.

==== China ====
- Emperor Xuan Zong forbids all commercial vendors and shops in the Chinese capital city of Chang'an to copy and sell Buddhist sutras, so that the emperor can give the clergy of the Buddhist monasteries the sole right to distribute written sutras to the laity.
- Summer – Xuan Zong makes his general Xue Ne de facto chancellor and commissions him, with a Chinese army (60,000 men), to attack the Khitans (Mongolia). Xue falls into a Khitan trap and the Tang forces are crushed, at an 80-90% casualty rate.
- Fall – Xue Ne repels a Tibetan invasion of the Lan Prefecture (modern Lanzhou). Xuan Zong creates Li Ying, his second son, crown prince of the Tang dynasty.

=== By topic ===
==== Religion ====
- Rupert, bishop of Salzburg, founds Nonnberg Abbey in modern-day Austria.

== Births ==
- Al-Mansur, Muslim caliph (d. 775)
- Fujiwara no Nagate, Japanese nobleman (d. 771)
- Pepin the Short, king of the Franks (d. 768)

== Deaths ==
- September 5 – Shang, emperor of the Tang dynasty
- December 16 – Pepin of Herstal, Mayor of the Palace
- Achila II, king of the Visigoths (approximate date)
- Al-Hajjaj ibn Yusuf, Arab governor (b. 661)
- Grimoald the Younger, Mayor of the Palace
- Guthlac of Crowland, Anglo-Saxon hermit
- Sa'id ibn Jubayr, Muslim scholar (b. 665)
