= AD 711 =

Calendar year

711 in various calendars
- Gregorian calendar: 711; DCCXI
- Ab urbe condita: 1464
- Armenian calendar: 160; ԹՎ ՃԿ
- Assyrian calendar: 5461
- Balinese saka calendar: 632–633
- Bengali calendar: 117–118
- Berber calendar: 1661
- Buddhist calendar: 1255
- Burmese calendar: 73
- Byzantine calendar: 6219–6220
- Chinese calendar: 庚戌年 (Metal Dog); 3408 or 3201 — to — 辛亥年 (Metal Pig); 3409 or 3202
- Coptic calendar: 427–428
- Discordian calendar: 1877
- Ethiopian calendar: 703–704
- Hebrew calendar: 4471–4472
- Hindu calendars
- Vikram Samvat: 767–768
- Shaka Samvat: 632–633
- Kali Yuga: 3811–3812
- Holocene calendar: 10711
- Iranian calendar: 89–90
- Islamic calendar: 92–93
- Japanese calendar: Wadō 4 (和銅４年)
- Javanese calendar: 604–605
- Julian calendar: 711; DCCXI
- Korean calendar: 3044
- Minguo calendar: 1201 before ROC 民前1201年
- Nanakshahi calendar: −757
- Seleucid era: 1022/1023 AG
- Thai solar calendar: 1253–1254
- Tibetan calendar: ལྕགས་ཕོ་ཁྱི་ལོ་ (male Iron-Dog); 837 or 456 or −316 — to — ལྕགས་མོ་ཕག་ལོ་ (female Iron-Boar); 838 or 457 or −315

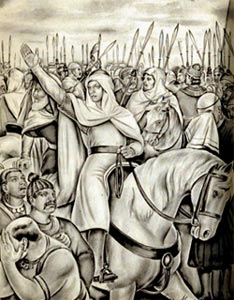
Muhammad ibn Qasim leading his troops in battle

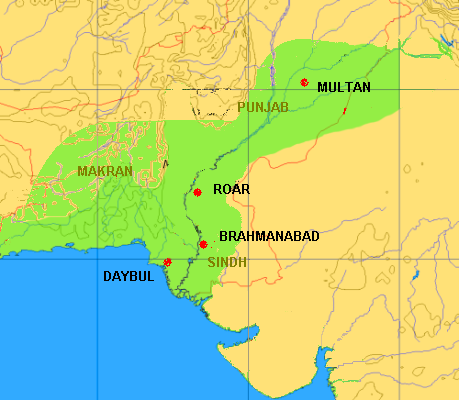
Qasim's expedition into northwestern India

Year 711 (DCCXI) was a common year starting on Thursday of the Julian calendar. The denomination 711 for this year has been used since the early medieval period, when the Anno Domini calendar era became the prevalent method in Europe for naming years.

== Events ==
=== By place ===
==== Byzantine Empire ====
- Philippicus incites the inhabitants of Cherson to revolt, with the help of the Khazars. Emperor Justinian II sallies forth from Constantinople to oppose the rebels in the Crimea. Philippicus defeats the Byzantine forces in northern Anatolia, and seizes the capital. He is proclaimed emperor and Justinian is executed, ending the house of Heraclius, that has ruled since 610.
- December – Upon hearing the news of Justinian's death, Anastasia, Justinian's mother, escapes with Justinian's 6-year-old son Tiberius to the sanctuary at the St. Mary's Church (Constantinople). She is pursued by Philippicus' henchmen, who drag the child from the altar and murder him outside the church. It is unknown what became of Justinian's wife, Theodora.

==== Europe ====
- Ansprand, duke of Asti, returns from exile to Italy with a large Bavarian army. Many Austrians (with troops of Venetia) join him in support. King Aripert II, who usurped the throne in 701, is defeated and tries to escape from Pavia to Gaul with his treasury, but drowns in the Ticino River. He is the last Bavarian to wear the Iron Crown (approximate date).
- Peaceful relations between Franks and Frisians are consolidated by the marriage of Pepin of Herstal's son Grimoald to Theudesinda, daughter of King Radbod.
- April 23 – King Childebert III dies after a 16-year reign, and is succeeded by his son Dagobert III as ruler of Austrasia. Pepin of Herstal becomes his regent.

==== Britain ====
- Dux Berhtfrith leads a Northumbrian campaign against the Picts, and defeats them in Manaw Gododdin (modern Scotland) (approximate date).

==== Arabian Empire ====
- April 27 – Umayyad conquest of Hispania: Muslim troops (7,000 men) led by Tariq ibn Ziyad land at Gibraltar, and begin their invasion of the Iberian Peninsula (now Spain and Portugal). Tariq begins his Islamic conquest of the Visigothic Kingdom, which during the decade he occupies and brings under Umayyad sovereignty.
- July 19 – Battle of Guadalete: The Muslim Arabs defeat the Visigothic army (33,000 men) under King Roderick, who dies in battle. The Visigoth capital of Toledo opens its city gates; Tariq ibn Ziyad sends Moorish detachments to capture the cities of Córdoba and Seville (Andalusia).

==== Asia ====
- After pirates plunder an Arab ship near the mouth of the Indus River (Pakistan), Umayyad Arabs under Muhammad ibn Qasim invade India with 10,000 men and 6,000 horses, establishing a sultanate in Sindh. Qasim sends expeditions to Surashtra, where he makes peaceful treaty settlements with the Rashtrakuta.
- Muhammad ibn Qasim captures the fortress city of Multan after a long siege, and raids with his forces the Punjab region, with only light Muslim casualties.

==== Mesoamerica ====
- Palenque is conquered by Tonina.

=== By topic ===
==== Religion ====
- Reconstruction of the Hōryū-ji Temple in Japan is completed (approximate date).

== Births ==
- Malik ibn Anas, Arab scholar (approximate date)
- Su Zong, emperor of the Tang dynasty (d. 762)

== Deaths ==
- April 23 – Childebert III, king of the Franks
- November 4 – Justinian II, Byzantine emperor (b. 669)
- December – Tiberius, son of Justinian II (b. 705)
- Seachnasach, king of Uí Maine (Ireland)
- Aripert II, king of the Lombards (or 712)
- Kʼinich Kʼan Joy Chitam II, ruler of Palenque (or c. 721)
- Roderic, king of the Visigoths (or 712)
