= Eadberht II =

King of Kent

Eadberht II was king of Kent, jointly with Sigered. He was apparently the son of Æðelberht II.

Eadberht II is known from three charters. As a result of confusion with Eadberht I, these charters have been subjected to tampering. One is dated 747 (the year before the death of Eadberht I), but witnessed by Archbishop Bregowine (761–764), as are the two undated charters, one of which refers to Æðelberht II (atque clementissimi regis Æthelberti, et corporum sepulture, necnon et pro missarum solemniis exhibendis). Eadberht II also witnessed a charter of Sigered, dated 762.

== See also ==
- List of monarchs of Kent
