= Sigered of Kent =

King of Kent

Sigered was king of Kent, reigning jointly with Eadberht II in the eighth century.

Sigered is known just from his charters, one of which is dated 762 and witnessed by Eadberht II.

== See also ==
- List of monarchs of Kent
