= 670s =

Decade

The 670s decade ran from January 1, 670, to December 31, 679.

== Events ==
=== 670 ===
==== By place ====
====== Byzantine Empire ======
- Arab-Byzantine War: The Arab fleet dominates the Aegean Sea and conquers the strategic islands, Rhodes, Cos and Chios. The shore on the southern part of Sea of Marmara is taken, providing an excellent base at Cyzicus to begin the blockade of Constantinople by sea.

====== Britain ======
- February 15 – King Oswiu of Northumbria dies during a pilgrimage to Rome in the company of bishop Wilfrid. He is succeeded by his son Ecgfrith, while his youngest son Ælfwine becomes king of Deira. Oswiu is buried at Whitby Abbey, alongside Edwin of Northumbria.

====== Arabian Empire ======
- Muslim Conquest: A 10,000-man Arab army under the command of general Uqba ibn Nafi invades the Byzantine Exarchate of Africa. He establishes a military base at Kairouan (Tunisia) for further invasions, and founds the Great Mosque, also known as the "Mosque of Uqba".

April 2 - Hasan Ibn Ali, dies at 44.

====== Asia ======
- Battle of Dafei River: Chinese forces (80,000 men), under general Xue Rengui of the Tang dynasty, are annihilated by the Tibetans, who take over control of the Tarim Basin.
- A Goguryeo restoration movement, led by Geom Mojam in northern Korea, places Anseung on the throne. Geom is later murdered, and Anseung flees to neighboring Silla.
- Tarumanagara (modern Indonesia) is divided into two kingdoms (Sunda Kingdom and Galuh Kingdom), with the Citarum River as the boundary (approximate date).
- A family register, Kogo-nenjaku, is prepared in Japan (approximate date) ^{[Significance of this event is unclear]}.

==== By topic ====
====== Religion ======
- Hōryū-ji, a Japanese Buddhist temple, burns to the ground after being hit by lightning; its reconstruction is immediately begun.
- The diocese of Dorchester-on-Thames in England is replaced by the Diocese of Winchester (approximate date).

=== 671 ===
- December 7 – An annular solar eclipse is visible from Tibet to the Maghreb.

==== By place ====
====== Europe ======
- Perctarit returns to Lombardy from exile and reclaims his realm, which is being ruled on behalf of Garibald, since his father King Grimoald I died. He deposes the young king, and becomes the new ruler of the Lombard Kingdom in Italy. During his reign Perctarit makes Catholicism the official religion, but does not recognize papal authority. Grimoald is buried in the St. Ambrogio Church (Milan).

====== Britain ======
- Battle of Two Rivers: King Ecgfrith of Northumbria defeats the Picts under King Drest VI, in the vicinity of Moncreiffe Island, near Perth (Scotland). After the battle the Picts are reduced to slavery, and subject to the yoke of captivity for the next 14 years.

====== Asia ======
- Yijing, Chinese Buddhist monk, travels by boat from Guangzhou, and visits the capital of the partly Buddhist kingdom of Srivijaya in Palembang (Indonesia). He stays for 6 months to study Sanskrit grammar and the Malay language.
- June 10 – Emperor Tenji introduces a water clock (clepsydra) called Rokoku. The instrument, which measures time and indicates hours, is placed in the capital of Ōtsu in Japan.
- Silla seizes control of the former Baekje capital of Sabi from the Tang Protectorate General to Pacify the East.

=== 672 ===
==== By place ====
====== Europe ======
- Wamba succeeds Recceswinth as king of the Visigoths. After ascending to the throne he faces a revolt from Hilderic, governor of Nîmes, who has himself aspired to the kingship. He is supported by Gumild, bishop of Maguelone. Wamba sends dux Paulus to Septimania (Southern France) to end the hostilities, but on his arrival at Narbonne, Paulus proclaims himself king.

====== Britain ======
- King Cenwalh of Wessex dies after a 31-year reign, in which he has lost much of his territory to Welsh and Mercian forces. He is succeeded by his widow Seaxburh. His sub-kings divide Wessex amongst themselves (approximate date).

====== Asia ======
- January 7 – Emperor Tenji dies after a 10-year reign, in which he has given the Fujiwara clan its name. Following his death, there ensues a succession dispute between Tenji's 14 children (many by different mothers). He is succeeded by his favorite son Kōbun, age 23, who was the first accorded with the title Daijō-daijin.
- August 21 – Kōbun is deposed after 8 months, during a brief but violent battle called the Jinshin War. He is succeeded by his uncle Ōama, who becomes the 40th emperor of Japan with support from the Fujiwara family. He takes the name Tenmu, and begins a reign that will continue until 686.

====== Americas ======
- As part of the Second Tikal–Calakmul War, Bʼalaj Chan Kʼawiil is again forced to abandon Dos Pilas, after it is attacked by an insurgency led by Nuun Ujol Chaak against Calakmul.

==== By topic ====
====== Literature ======
- Cædmon, Anglo-Saxon poet, writes a nine-line hymn on the Creation. A onetime illiterate herdsman, he becomes a monk under the rule of Hilda of Whitby, where he will turn various biblical themes into vernacular poetry (approximate date).

====== Religion ======
- January 27 – Pope Vitalian dies at Rome after a reign of more than 14 years. He is succeeded by Adeodatus II as the 77th pope.
- Máel Ruba, Irish abbot, founds one of the first Christian monasteries in Applecross (Scotland) located in hostile Pictish territory.
- Wilfrid, bishop of York, brings stonemasons, plasterers and glaziers from France and Italy to build Ripon Cathedral (England).

=== 673 ===
==== By place ====
====== Europe ======
- Spring – King Chlothar III of Neustria and Burgundy dies after a reign of 16 years, in which he has been a puppet — roi fainéant — of the Neustrian mayor of the palace, Ebroin. He is buried in the Basilica of St. Denis, and succeeded by his brother Theuderic III.
- Burgundian nobles, under the leadership of bishop Leodegar and Adalrich, invite Childeric II to become king in Neustria and Burgundy. He invades Theuderic's kingdom and displaces his brother, becoming sole king of the Frankish Kingdom.
- September 3 – King Wamba of the Visigoths puts down the revolt by Hilderic, governor of Nîmes and rival for the throne. He captures the rebel leaders, who are brought to trial and, for their crimes, scalped and imprisoned for life.

====== Britain ======
- King Frithuwold of Surrey flourishes under Mercian domination. The marriage of his daughter Osgyth to King Sighere of Essex breaks down. She desires the religious life, and flees the Essex court to the protection of bishop Bedwinus of North Elmham (Norfolk).
- King Domangart mac Domnaill of Dál Riata (Scotland) dies, and is succeeded by his nephew Máel Dúin mac Conaill. He probably submits to King Ecgfrith of Northumbria as his overlord.
- July 4 – King Ecgberht I of Kent dies after a reign of nearly 9 years. He is succeeded by his brother Hlothhere.

====== Asia ======
- March 20 – Emperor Tenmu assumes the Chrysanthemum Throne of Japan at the Palace of Kiyomihara, in Asuka.

==== By topic ====
====== Religion ======
- Æthelthryth, Anglo-Saxon princess, returns to East Anglia and founds the Abbey of Ely (Cambridgeshire). At about this time a small nunnery is also founded in her name, in Stow Green.
- The Council of Hertford is held and convened by Theodore of Tarsus, archbishop of Canterbury. The council makes canons for the English Church.

=== 674 ===
==== By place ====
====== Byzantine Empire ======
- Siege of Constantinople: The Arab fleet enters the Sea of Marmara and appears before the southern walls of Constantinople, in an attempt to blockade the Byzantine capital.
- April – A Muslim expeditionary force disembarks on the Thracian shore (near Hebdomon), and lays siege to the massive Theodosian Walls, on the landward side to the west.
- Summer – Abu Ayyub al-Ansari, companion and standard-bearer of Muhammad, is killed during the first attempt of the siege of the city (approximate date).
- Winter – Arab forces under Yazid (son of caliph Muawiyah I) retire to Cyzicus (Turkey). For the next 4 years the Arab fleet installs a loose blockade around Constantinople.

====== Europe ======
- The Muslim-Arabs raid Crete, killing and enslaving many soldiers (approximate date).

====== Britain ======
- King Ecgfrith of Northumbria defeats a coalition led by the Mercians. He annexes the region of Lindsey (Lincolnshire).
- King Æscwine succeeds his father Cenfus as ruler of Wessex (approximate date).

====== Asia ======
- King Vikramaditya I of Chalukya defeats the Pallavan army in battle, and destroys its capital Kanchi (modern India).
- In Korea, Anapji is constructed by order of King Munmu of Silla.
- In Japan, Princess Ōku proceeds to the Ise Jingu.

==== By topic ====
====== Religion ======
- Æthelthryth, former queen of Northumbria, gives large areas of land to bishop Wilfrid to found Hexham Abbey.
- The Monkwearmouth monastery is founded by Benedict Biscop in Northumbria.
- The first glass windows are placed in English churches (approximate date).

=== 675 ===
==== By place ====
====== Europe ======
- King Childeric II is murdered by a band of dissatisfied Neustrians, along with his wife Bilichild and 5-year-old son Dagobert, while hunting in the forest of Livry (modern-day Lognes) near Chelles.
- Theuderic III retakes the throne of his elder brother Childeric II. He inherits the Frankish kingdoms of Neustria and Burgundy.
- Clovis III, an illegitimate son of Chlothar III, is proclaimed king of Austrasia by the Austrasian nobles.

====== Britain ======
- King Wulfhere of Mercia dies after a 17-year reign, in which he has extended his sway over much of England south of the Humber River, including Essex, Surrey, and part of Wessex north of the Thames. Wulfhere is succeeded by his brother Æthelred.
- April 1 – King Hlothhere of Kent re-establishes Kentish supremacy in London.

====== Asia ======
- 25-year-old poet Wang Bo (王勃) writes Tengwang Ge Xu, to celebrate the Tengwang Pavilion (approximate date).
- January 5 – In Japan, a platform to observe the stars for astrologers is erected for the first time.
- March 14 – Princess Tōchi and Princess Abe of Japan proceed to Ise Jingū.
- March 16 – Emperor Tenmu decrees the end of serfdom. He also orders an end to granting lands to Princes of the Blood, to Princes and to Ministers and Temples.
- May 8 – Tenmu issues a decree to distribute the tax-rice for peasants in poverty, as well as a decree regulating fishing and hunting, and ordering a halt to eating the flesh of cattle, horses, dogs, monkeys and barn-yard fowl, a prohibition which lasts until 1872.
- Some Japanese ministers who oppose Tenmu are banished to an isolated island. A man climbs the hill east of the Palace, curses the emperor and kills himself.
- September 16 – A typhoon strikes Japan.

==== By topic ====
====== Religion ======
- The abbeys of Abingdon and Bath, England are founded (approximate date).
- Aldhelm is made abbot of Malmesbury Abbey in England.

=== 676 ===
==== By place ====
====== Byzantine Empire ======
- Summer – Siege of Constantinople: Caliph Muawiyah I sends his son Yazid with Muslim reinforcements to Constantinople. At the same time, the Byzantines have to face a Slavic attack on Thessaloniki and Lombard attacks in Italy.

====== Europe ======
- Dagobert II, son of the late king Sigibert III, becomes (partly with the help of Bishop Wilfrid) the new ruler of Austrasia, after his predecessor Clovis III is murdered.

====== Britain ======
- King Æthelred of Mercia invades Kent, in an attempt to enforce overlordship and diminish Kentish influence in Surrey and London. His armies destroy the Diocese of Rochester (seat of the bishops in West Kent), and ravage the surrounding countryside.
- King Æscwine of Wessex dies after a 2-year reign, and is succeeded by Centwine, son of the late king Cynegils. He reasserts the power of his Anglo-Saxon kingdom over the Welsh.

====== Asia ======
- Emperor Tenmu of Japan promulgates a decree about taxes from fiefs, and the employment of persons for the service from the outer provinces. Men of distinguished ability are allowed to enter the service, even though they are of the common people, regardless of their ranks.
- The broad-based peninsular effort under Silla's leadership, to prevent Chinese domination of Korea, succeeds in forcing Chinese troops to withdraw into Manchuria, in northeast China.

==== By topic ====
====== Religion ======
- Aldhelm, Anglo-Saxon scholar-poet, founds Malmesbury Abbey on the site of the hermitage of his old tutor Máel Dub.
- Æthelred of Mercia founds the monastery at Breedon on the Hill on the site of The Bulwarks, an Iron Age hill fort.
- June 17 – Pope Adeodatus II dies at Rome after a reign of 4 years. He is succeeded by Donus as the 78th pope.
- Cuthbert of Lindisfarne retires to a hermitage near Holburn, at a place now known as St. Cuthbert's Cave.

=== 677 ===
==== By place ====
====== Europe ======
- The Onogur Bulgars are scattered by the Khazars, who then establish a great Steppe empire, centered on the Lower Volga. The Onogurs depart to the Pannonian Plain.
- Warinus, Frankish nobleman, is stoned to death near Arras, because of a feud between his brother, Leodegar (bishop of Autun), and Ebroin, the Mayor of the Palace of Neustria.
- 25 – 27 July: Climax of the Siege of Thessalonica: Slavic forces launch a large-scale assault on the city walls, but are repelled.

====== Asia ======
- Tang China declares the deposed Bojang of Goguryeo "King of Joseon", placing him in charge of the Liaodong area under the Protectorate General to Pacify the East.

====== Americas ======
- At Pulil, the army of Calakmul vanquishes the insurgency led by Nuun Ujol Chaak, meaning Bʼalaj Chan Kʼawiil is able to return to rule Dos Pilas, from his exile in the kingdom of Hix Witz.

=== 678 ===
==== By place ====
====== Byzantine Empire ======
- July 27 – The Siege of Thessalonica (676–678) ends, when the Sclaveni withdraw.
- Autumn – Siege of Constantinople: Emperor Constantine IV confronts the Arab besiegers in a head-on engagement. The Byzantine fleet, equipped with Greek fire, destroys the Muslim fleet at Sillyon, ending the Arab threat to Europe, and forcing Yazid (a son of caliph Muawiyah I) to lift the siege on land and sea. The victory also frees up forces that are sent to raise the two-year siege of Thessalonica by the local Slavic tribes.

====== Britain ======
- King Æthelred of Mercia defeats the Northumbrian forces under King Ecgfrith, in a battle near the River Trent. Archbishop Theodore helps to resolve differences between the two, Æthelred agreeing to pay a weregild to avoid any resumption of hostilities (approximate date).

====== Japan ======
- April 27 – Emperor Tenmu holds divination for the purpose of proceeding to the Abstinence Palace.
- May 3 – Princess Tōchi suddenly takes ill and dies within the palace. Tenmu, her father, is unable to sacrifice to the Gods of Heaven and Earth.
- May 10 – Tōchi is buried at a place which could be Akō (Hyōgo Prefecture). Tenmu is graciously pleased to raise lament for her.

==== By topic ====
====== Religion ======
- Wilfrid, bishop of York, is at the height of his power and owns vast estates throughout Northumbria. After his refusal to agree to a division of his see, Ecgfrith and Theodore, archbishop of Canterbury, have him banished from Northumbria.
- April 11 – Pope Donus dies at Rome, after a reign of 1 year and 160 days. He is succeeded by Agatho I, who becomes the 79th pope. He is the first pope to stop paying tribute to Emperor Constantine IV upon election.
- In Japan, the national worshiping to the Gods of Heaven and Earth is planned. Tenmu tries to select his daughter Tōchi as a Saiō to make her serve the Gods. However, Tōchi suddenly takes ill and dies.
- The Beomeosa temple complex in Geumjeong-gu (modern South Korea) is constructed, during the reign of King Munmu of Silla.

=== 679 ===
==== By place ====
====== Byzantine Empire ======
- Emperor Constantine IV signs a peace treaty, of a nominal 30-year duration, with Caliph Mu'awiya I of the Umayyad Caliphate. Constantine pays an annual tribute of 3,000 (nomismata) pounds of gold, 50 horses and 50 slaves. The Arab garrisons are withdrawn from their bases on the Byzantine coastlands, including Crete & Cyzicus.

====== Europe ======
- December 23 – King Dagobert II is murdered in a hunting accident, near Stenay-sur-Meuse (Ardennes), probably on orders from Pepin of Herstal, the mayor of the palace of Austrasia. He is succeeded by Theuderic III, who becomes sole ruler of the Frankish Kingdom.

====== Britain ======
- King Æthelred of Mercia marries Princess Osthryth, sister of King Ecgfrith of Northumbria (approximate date).

====== Americas ======
- Nuun Ujol Chaak, an ajaw of the Maya city of Tikal, is by this year deceased, after his final defeat at the hands of Bʼalaj Chan Kʼawiil, during the Second Tikal–Calakmul War.

==== By topic ====
====== Religion ======
- Adomnán, clerical lawyer, becomes abbot of the monastery of Iona Abbey, located on the island of Iona (modern Scotland).
- October 2 – Leodegar, bishop of Autun, is tortured and executed by Neustrian nobles at Fécamp (Normandy).

== Births ==
670

- Bertrada of Prüm, Merovingian princess (approximate date)
- Childebert III, king of the Franks (approximate date)
- Corbinian, Frankish bishop (approximate date)
- Drogo, Carolingian duke of Champagne (d. 708)
- Petronax, Italian monk and abbot (approximate date)
- Smbat VI, Armenian prince (approximate date)
- Tariq ibn Ziyad, Muslim general (d. 720)
- Tatwine, archbishop of Canterbury (approximate date)
- Tridu Songtsen, emperor of Tibet (d. 704)
- Wihtred, king of Kent (approximate date)

671

- Sigebert IV, Frankish prince (approximate date)

672

- Bede, Anglo-Saxon theologian and historian (approximate date)
- Chilperic II, king of the Franks (approximate date)
- Yazid ibn al-Muhallab, Muslim governor (d. 720)

673

- Æthelburg, queen of Wessex (approximate date)
- Bede, Anglo-Saxon theologian and historian (or 672)
- Guthlac of Crowland, Anglo-Saxon hermit (d. 714)
- Pega, Anglo-Saxon anchoress (approximate date)
- Zhang Jiuling, chancellor of the Tang dynasty (d. 740)

674

- Poppo, king (duke) of Frisia (d. 734)
- Sulayman ibn Abd al-Malik, Muslim caliph (approximate date)

675

- Boniface, Anglo-Saxon missionary (approximate date)
- Huoching, Alamannic nobleman (approximate date)
- Niu Xianke, chancellor of the Tang dynasty (d. 742)
- Tervel, ruler (khagan) of the Bulgarian Empire (d. 721)
- Wigbert, Anglo-Saxon monk (approximate date)

676

- January 28 – Toneri, Japanese prince (d. 735)
- John of Damascus, Syrian monk and priest (approximate date)
- Muhammad al-Baqir, fifth Shia Imam (approximate date; d. 733)

677

- Abdallah ibn Abd al-Malik, Arab general (approximate date)
- Clovis IV, King of the Franks (d. 694)
- Muḥammad ibn ‘Alī, fifth Shi'a Imam; d. 733)
- Nanyue Huairang, Chinese Zen Buddhist patriarch (d. 744)

678

- Childebert III, Merovingian Frankish king and son of Theuderic III
- Childebrand I, duke of Burgundy (d. 751)
- Kʼinich Ahkal Moʼ Nahb III, Maya ruler of Palenque

679

- Sima Zhen, Chinese historian (d. 732)
- Zachary, pope of the Catholic Church (d. 752)

== Deaths ==
670

- February 15 – Oswiu, king of Northumbria
- August 18 – Fiacre, Irish hermit
- Audomar, bishop of Thérouanne (approximate date)
- Geom Mojam, military leader of Goguryeo
- Hasan ibn Ali, grandson of Muhammad and second Shi'a Imam (b. 625)
- Javanshir, king of Caucasian Albania
- Li Chunfeng, Chinese mathematician and historian (b. 602)
- Merewalh, king of Magonsæte (approximate date)
- Safiyya bint Huyayy, wife of Muhammad (approximate date)
- Theodard, bishop of Maastricht (approximate date)

671

- Grimoald I, king of the Lombards

672

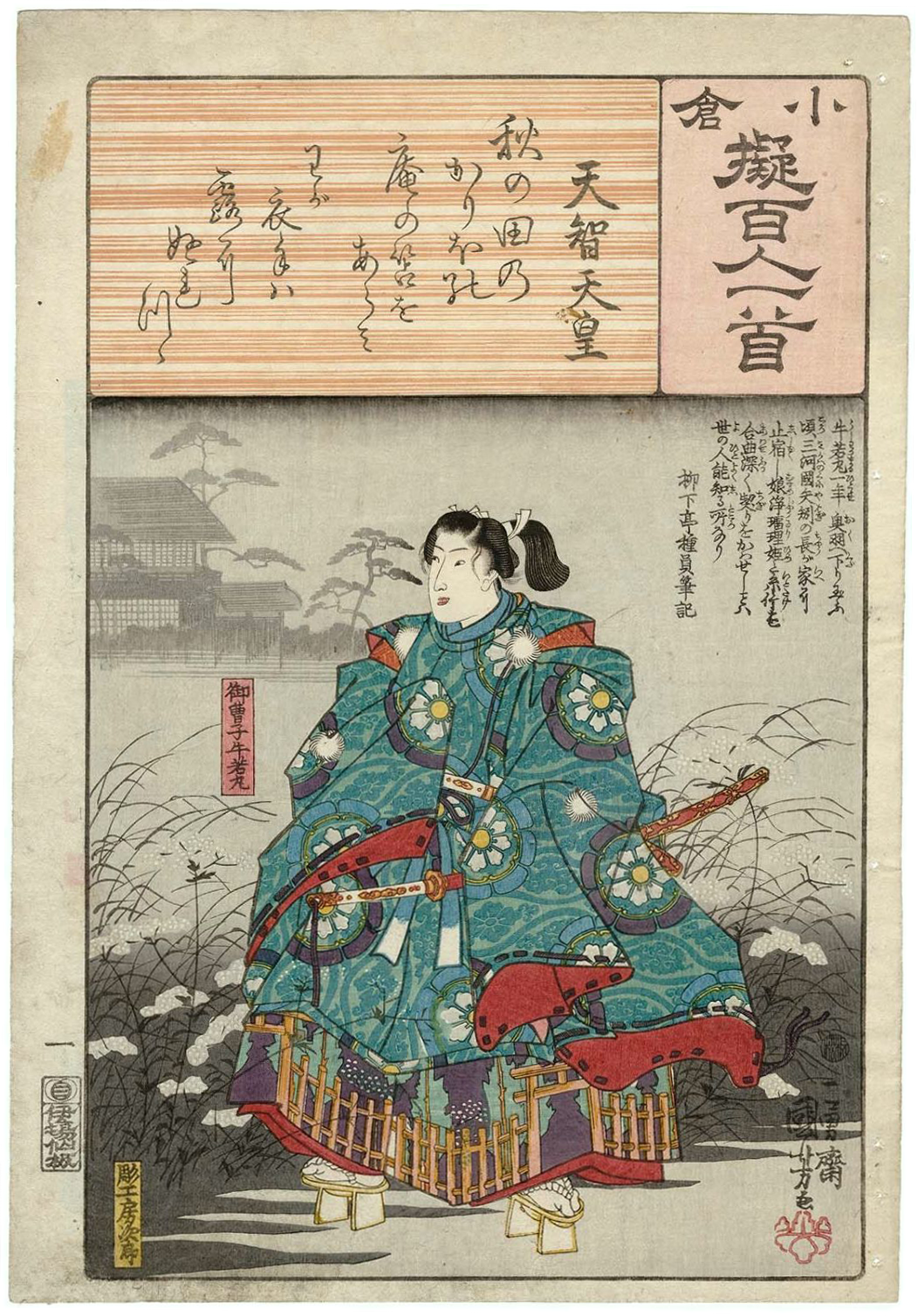
Emperor Tenji

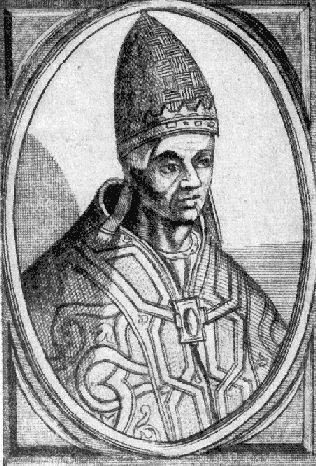
Pope Vitalian

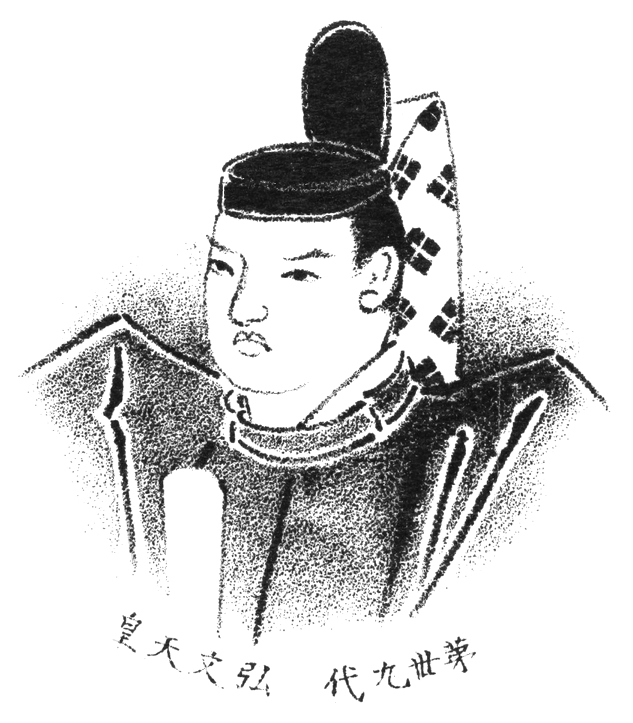
Emperor Kōbun

- January 7 – Tenji, emperor of Japan (b. 626)
- January 27 – Pope Vitalian
- March 2 – Chad of Mercia, Anglo-Saxon abbot
- August 21 – Kōbun, emperor of Japan (b. 648)
- Cenwalh, king of Wessex (approximate date)
- Jiang Ke, general of the Tang dynasty
- Recceswinth, king of the Visigoths
- Xu Jingzong, chancellor of the Tang dynasty (b. 592)

673

- July 4 – Ecgberht, king of Kent
- August 18 – Kim Yu-shin, general of Silla (b. 595)
- Agilbert, Anglo-Saxon bishop (approximate date)
- Chlothar III, king of Neustria and Burgundy (b. 652)
- Domangart mac Domnaill, king of Dál Riata (Scotland)
- Remaclus, Frankish missionary (approximate date)
- Yan Liben, painter and official of the Tang dynasty
- Ziyad ibn Abi Sufyan, Muslim general

674

- Abu Ayyub al-Ansari, friend (sahabah) of Muhammad (approximate date)
- Hassan ibn Thabit, Arab poet and companion of Muhammad
- Hongren, Chán (Buddhist) patriarch of the Tang dynasty (b. 601)
- Seaxburh, queen of Wessex (approximate date)

675

- February 18 – Colmán, bishop of Lindisfarne
- February 21 – Randoald of Grandval, prior of the Benedictine monastery of Grandval
- May 25 – Li Hong, prince of the Tang dynasty (b. 652)
- Amandus, bishop and saint
- Bilichild, Frankish queen
- Childeric II, king of the Franks
- Germanus of Granfelden, Frankish abbot
- Lupus I, duke of Aquitaine (approximate date)
- Máel Dub, Irish monk (approximate date)
- Wulfhere, king of Mercia

676

- June 17 – Pope Adeodatus II
- Æscwine, king of Wessex
- Clovis III, king of Austrasia
- Le Yanwei, chancellor of the Tang dynasty
- Mangsong Mangtsen, emperor of Tibet
- Wang Bo, Chinese poet

677

- Constantine I, patriarch of Constantinople
- Drest VI, king of the Picts
- Vincent Madelgarius, Frankish monk
- Warinus, Frankish nobleman

678

- April 11 – Pope Donus
- May 3 – Tōchi, Japanese princess
- Abdullah ibn Aamir, Arab general (b. 626)
- Ælfwine, king of Deira (approximate date)
- Aisha, wife of Muhammad
- Arbogast, bishop of Strasbourg
- Nathalan, Scottish bishop
- Wechtar, Lombard duke of Friuli
- Zhang Wenguan, chancellor of the Tang dynasty (b. 606)

679

- June 23 – Æthelthryth, queen of Northumbria
- October 2, Leodegar, bishop of Autun
- December 23 – Dagobert II, king of Austrasia
- Ælfwine, king of Deira (approximate date)
- Cenn Fáelad mac Ailella, Irish scholar
- Dai Zhide, chancellor of the Tang dynasty
- Sigebert IV, Frankish prince (approximate date)
- Xu Yushi, chancellor of the Tang dynasty、
