= 7th century in England =

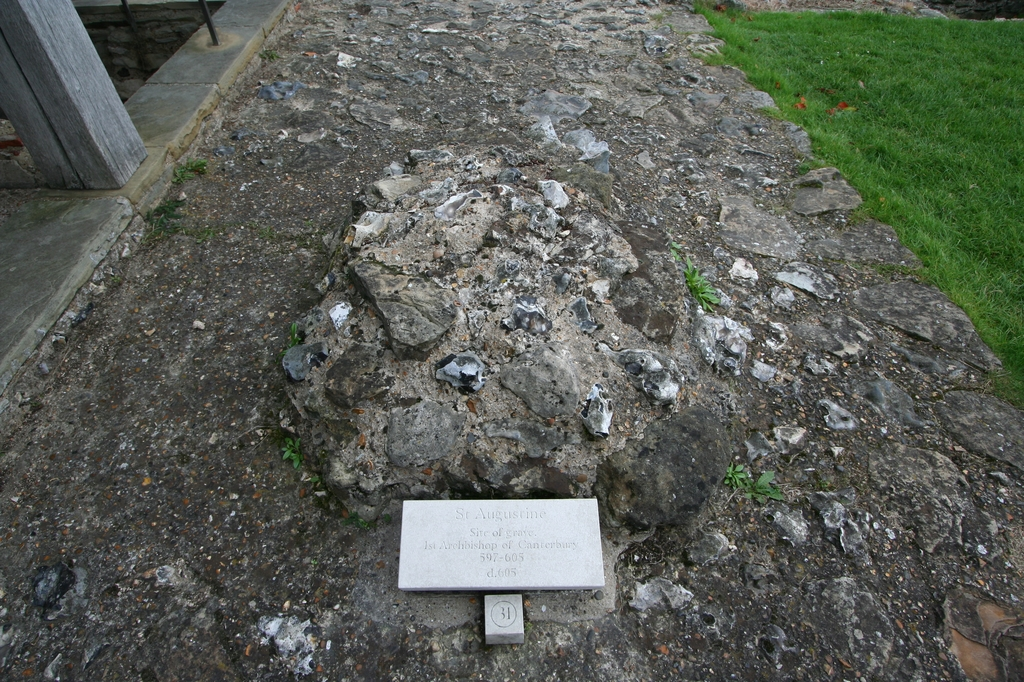
Tomb site of St Augustine of Canterbury

Events from the 7th century in England.

== Events ==
- c. 600–660
  - Repton Abbey founded.
- 601
  - The Bishopric of Canterbury is raised to an Archbishopric. The future holders of the office of Archbishop, Mellitus, Justus and Honorius, and the future Archbishop of York Paulinus, are sent to England by Pope Gregory I to aid Augustine in his missionary work. Gregory writes the decretal Libellus responsionum to Augustine.
- 604
  - 26 May – death of Augustine, the first Archbishop of Canterbury. He is succeeded by Laurence.
  - The first post-Roman Bishop of London (Mellitus) and Bishop of Rochester (Justus) are consecrated; King Æthelberht of Kent founds St Paul's Cathedral in the City of London and grants land for the support of Rochester Cathedral; and King's School, Rochester is established.
  - Sæbert succeeds his father Sledd as king of Essex. He is persuaded to convert personally to Christianity through the intervention of his uncle, Æthelberht of Kent, and is baptised by Mellitus.
  - King Æthelfrith unites Bernicia and Deira under one ruler to create the Kingdom of Northumbria.
- 614
  - Cynegils and Cwichelm of Wessex fight on the same side at Beandun, defeating the Welsh.
- 616
  - 24 February – death of Æthelberht of Kent. He is succeeded by Eadbald. A pagan backlash against Christianity causes Bishops Justus and Mellitus to flee briefly to Gaul.
  - Battle of Chester: King Æthelfrith of Northumbria defeats Powys.
  - Battle of the River Idle: King Rædwald of East Anglia kills Æthelfrith of Northumbria, and conquers the Kingdom of Elmet.
- 619
  - 2 February – death of Laurence, the second Archbishop of Canterbury. He is succeeded by Mellitus.
- 624
  - 24 April – death of Mellitus, the third Archbishop of Canterbury. He is succeeded by Justus, who dies at a date prior to 631 and is succeeded by Honorius.
- 625 or before
  - The ship burial at Sutton Hoo is committed to the ground.
- 625
  - 21 July? – Paulinus consecrated as the first Bishop of York.
- 626
  - 19 April – Edwin of Northumbria escapes an assassin sent by the king of Wessex on the same day as Edwin's daughter Eanflæd is born.
- 627
  - Paulinus converts Northumbria and the Kingdom of Lindsey to Christianity, baptising King Edwin of Northumbria on 12 April, for which purpose the first (wooden) York Minster is built. Elmet is fully incorporated into Northumbria. Also this year, Paulinus founds St Peter's School, York, which continues in existence into the 21st century.
- 628
  - Battle of Cirencester: King Penda of Mercia defeats Wessex and captures lands along the River Severn.
- 630
  - King Ricberht of East Anglia dies and is succeeded by Sigeberht who returns from exile in France. He rules together with his kinsman Ecgric, re-establishing Christianity.
  - King Penda of Mercia besieges Exeter. King Cadwallon ap Cadfan of Gwynedd lands with a force nearby and negotiates an alliance with Penda.
  - Eanswith, daughter of king Eadbald of Kent, founds the Benedictine Folkestone Priory, the first nunnery in England.
- 631
  - Felix of Burgundy and the Irish monk Fursey convert the Kingdom of East Anglia to Christianity.
- 633
  - 12 October – Battle of Hatfield Chase (near Doncaster): Gwynedd and Mercia attack and defeat Northumbria; Elmet and Ebrauc temporarily return to Celtic rule.
- 634
  - Eanfrith of Bernicia is killed while attempting to negotiate peace with Cadwallon ap Cadfan, King of Gwynedd.
  - Battle of Heavenfield (near Hexham): Northumbrian forces led by Oswald of Bernicia decisively defeat the larger forces of Gwynedd under Cadwallon (who is killed). Oswald reunites the kingdoms of Bernicia and Deira under his single rule and begins re-conversion of Northumbria to Christianity.
  - Aidan founds the priory at Lindisfarne, becoming bishop in 635.
- 635
  - Birinus, the French-born first Bishop of Dorchester, begins the conversion of Wessex to Christianity. King Cynegils of Wessex is baptised at about this time.
- 638
  - King Oswald of Northumbria captures Edinburgh.
- 640
  - 20 January – death of Eadbald of Kent. He is succeeded by his son Eorcenberht.
- 642
  - 5 August – Battle of Maserfield: King Penda of Mercia kills Oswald of Northumbria and divides his realm. Oswald's brother Oswiu becomes king of Bernicia, subject to Penda.
  - c.642 or 643 – Cenwalh succeeds his father Cynegils as King of Wessex.
- 643
  - Widsith, the earliest surviving example of English heroic prose, is composed.
- 645
  - Approximate date – Cenwalh of Wessex abjures Christianity and repudiates his wife for which he is driven from his kingdom by his brother-in-law Penda of Mercia and goes into exile with King Anna of East Anglia.
- 647
  - Probable date – death of Æthelburh of Kent, widowed queen consort of Northumbria and Benedictine Abbess of Lyminge (b. c.601).
- 648
  - Approximate date – Cenwalh of Wessex is restored to his kingdom by his nephew Cuthred.
- 649
  - 3 December – death of Birinus, Bishop of Dorchester, in his Wessex diocese; he is succeeded by Agilbert.
- 651
  - 31 August – death of Aidan, first bishop of Lindisfarne; he is succeeded by Finan.
  - King Oswiu of Bernicia declares war on his rival, King Oswine of Deira. Oswine refuses to engage him in battle, and retreats to Gilling (North Yorkshire) but is betrayed by a friend and murdered by Oswiu's soldiers.
  - Œthelwald succeeds his uncle Oswine as king of Deira, and allies himself with Oswiu's enemy, King Penda of Mercia. Queen Eanflæd of Bernicia donates the estate of Gilling for the foundation of a monastery.
- 652
  - Cenwalh of Wessex wins a battle at Bradford-on-Avon.
- 653
  - Sigeberht the Good succeeds Sigeberht the Little as king of Essex.
  - The Northumbrian monk Cedd begins the conversion of Mercia and Essex to Christianity at the request of Sigeberht the Good.
  - 30 September – death of Honorius, Archbishop of Canterbury.
- 653 or 654
  - Battle of Bulcamp (near Blythburgh): King Anna of East Anglia is killed by Penda of Mercia and succeeded by his brother Æthelhere of East Anglia.
- 654
  - Bishop Cedd establishes the Chapel of St Peter-on-the-Wall near Bradwell-on-Sea in Essex.
- 655
  - March – Deusdedit is consecrated as the first native-born Archbishop of Canterbury.
  - 15 November – Battle of the Winwaed: King Oswiu of Bernicia kills King Penda of Mercia, giving himself rule over all of Northumbria and Mercia. He installs Penda's son Peada as client king of Mercia south of the River Trent. Æthelhere of East Anglia is also killed in the battle and succeeded by his brother Æthelwold.
- 656
  - Easter – Peada of Mercia is killed through the treachery of his wife (Oswiu's daughter).
  - Approximate date – foundation of Medeshamstede Abbey (predecessor of Peterborough) in Mercia under Seaxwulf.
- 657
  - Hilda founds Whitby Abbey.
- 658
  - (Between 657 and 659) – three Mercian leaders, Immin, Eafa and Eadbert, rebel against Northumbrian rule and instal Wulfhere (Peada's brother) as king of all Mercia, its first Christian ruler.
  - Battle of Peonnum: King Cenwalh of Wessex conquers Dorset and Somerset, pushing the Britons into Devon and Cornwall.
- 660
  - First Bishop of Winchester (Wine) consecrated.
- 661
  - Battle of Posbury: King Cenwalh of Wessex invades Dumnonia (South West England). He is victorious over the native Briton tribes near Crediton in Devon and drives them to the coast.
  - King Wulfhere of Mercia and his army sack the Berkshire Downs (south of Thame) and move south to conquer the Meonwara and the Isle of Wight.
  - Wulfhere appoints Æthelwealh as king of Sussex and is baptised in Mercia. He receives the recently conquered territories in modern-day Hampshire.
- 662
  - Birth and death of Prince Rumwold of Buckingham, revered as an infant saint.
- 663
  - (After 658 and shortly before 664) – Wilfrid is granted the abbacy of Ripon by Alhfrith of Deira, ejects the previous abbot and other monks (including Cuthbert) who will not observe the customs of Rome and introduces the Rule of Saint Benedict.
- 664
  - Synod of Whitby: King Oswiu of Northumbria rules that his kingdom will calculate Easter and observe the monastic tonsure according to the customs of Rome rather than those of Celtic Christianity.
  - 14 July
    - Approximate date – death of Deusdedit, Archbishop of Canterbury. He is succeeded by Wighard who dies before his consecration and is succeeded by Theodore of Tarsus.
    - Death of Eorcenberht of Kent.
- 665
  - Approximate date – Wilfrid is elevated to a bishopric in Northumbria but travels to Compiègne to be consecrated.
- 666
  - Wilfrid returns to Britain but is shipwrecked in Sussex. When he finally reaches Northumbria he finds he has been deposed and is forced to retire to Ripon.
  - Earconwald establishes the Benedictine Chertsey Abbey for men and (at about this date) Barking Abbey for women (under his sister Æthelburh).
- 669
  - Theodore of Tarsus enthroned as Archbishop of Canterbury and tasked with re-organising the English Church.
  - Wilfrid is installed as Bishop of York.
  - First Bishop of Mercia (Diuma) consecrated, with his seat at Repton.
- 670
  - 15 February – Oswiu of Northumbria dies. He is succeeded as King of Bernicia by his elder son, Ecgfrith, and as King of Deira by his younger son, Ælfwine.
  - Traditional date of foundation of a monastery at Exeter.
- 672
  - King Ecgfrith of Northumbria defeats the Picts.
  - Cenwalh of Wessex dies. He is succeeded by his widow Seaxburh.
  - 26 September – Synod of Hertford gives the Archbishop of Canterbury authority over the whole of the English Church.
- c. 673
  - Birth of the Venerable Bede.
- 674
  - Construction of Ripon Minster, in the Italian style, begins.
  - Benedict Biscop founds Monkwearmouth-Jarrow Abbey.
  - Seaxburh of Wessex dies. She is probably succeeded by Æscwine.
- 675
  - Battle of Biedanheafde: Wulfhere of Mercia fights Æscwine of Wessex; the outcome is uncertain.
  - Wulfhere of Mercia dies and is succeeded as King of Mercia by his brother Æthelred of Mercia who will reign until 704.
  - Church of All Hallows established in the City of London.
- 676
  - First Bishop of Hereford (Putta) consecrated.
  - Abbess Berta founds a convent, the predecessor of Bath Abbey, under the protection of Osric, king of the Hwicce.
- 677
  - Wilfrid, the Bishop of York, expelled from Northumbria after resisting re-organisation of the Church.
- 678
  - Battle of the River Trent: Mercia defeats Northumbrian invasion.
- 678 or 679
  - Gloucester Abbey founded by Osric, king of the Hwicce with the consent of Æthelred of Mercia.
- 680
  - Wilfrid returns to Northumbria, with papal support, but is imprisoned by King Ecgfrith, and again exiled. He travels to the last Saxon pagan realm, the Kingdom of Sussex, and begins to convert its people to Christianity.
  - King Cædwalla of Wessex becomes overly ambitious in a power-struggle with his rival, King Centwine, for Wessex overlordship. He is banished into the forests of Chiltern and Andred.
  - First Bishop of Worcester (Episcopus Hwicciorum, Bosel) consecrated.
  - King Merewalh of Magonsæte founds the Benedictine monastery of Wenlock Priory in Shropshire, appointing his daughter Mildburh as abbess.
  - 17 September – Theodore of Tarsus, archbishop of Canterbury, convenes a synod at Hatfield that clears the English Church from any association with the heresy of monothelitism.
  - 17 December – Death of abbess Hilda of Whitby; she is succeeded by Eanflæd jointly with her daughter Ælfflæd.
  - Approximate date
    - Boniface begins his education at an English Celtic Christian monastery, probably in Exeter near his birthplace and one of many monasteriola built by local landowners and churchmen.
    - The gospel Book of Durrow is created, probably in Northumbria or on the island of Iona in the Scottish Inner Hebrides.
- 681
  - Centwine of Wessex pursues the Britons to the sea.
- 684
  - Cuthbert becomes Bishop of Hexham.
  - King Ecgfrith of Northumbria campaigns in Ireland.
- 685
  - 26 March – Cuthbert is consecrated Bishop of Lindisfarne.
  - 23 April – dedication of St Paul's Church, Monkwearmouth–Jarrow Abbey.
  - 20 May – Battle of Dun Nechtain: Picts kill Ecgfrith of Northumbria near Dunnichen in Scotland, ending Saxon rule north of the River Forth.
  - King Cædwalla of Wessex takes control of Kent, Surrey, Sussex, and the Isle of Wight.
- 687
  - 20 March – Death of Cuthbert, Bishop of Lindisfarne as a hermit on Inner Farne island; he is at first buried on Lindisfarne.
- 688
  - Cædwalla baptised in Rome, but dies shortly after and is succeeded by Ine.
  - Re-foundation of Glastonbury Abbey.
- 690
  - 19 September – death of Theodore of Tarsus, Archbishop of Canterbury. He is succeeded by Berhtwald.
  - c. 690 or 691 – Wihtred becomes ruler of the Anglo-Saxon Kingdom of Kent.
- 691
  - Wilfrid exiled again, to Mercia.
- 694
  - King Ine of Wessex writes a new code of laws. This includes a requirement for children to be baptised soon after birth.
- 695
  - 6 September (likely date) – Law of Wihtred issued in the Kingdom of Kent.
- 698
  - Creation of the Lindisfarne Gospels perhaps begins; its creator Eadfrith becomes Bishop of Lindisfarne probably in this year.

== Sources ==
- Ray, Roger (2001). "Bede". In Lapidge, Michael; et al. (eds.). Blackwell Encyclopedia of Anglo-Saxon England. Malden, MA: Blackwell. pp. 57–59. ISBN 978-0-631-22492-1.
