= List of royal consorts of Wessex =

The royal consorts of Wessex were the wives of the reigning monarchs of the Kingdom of Wessex. History has not always recorded whether each king of Wessex was married or not. In Wessex it was not customary for kings' wives to be queens but Judith was crowned queen following her marriage to Æthelwulf.

Wessex was an Anglo-Saxon kingdom in the south of Great Britain, from 519 AD until England was unified by Æthelstan (who never married) in 927 AD.

| Picture | Name | Parents | Birth | Marriage | Became Consort | Ceased to be Consort | Death | Spouse |
|---|---|---|---|---|---|---|---|---|
| | Seaxburh (possibly) | | | – | no earlier than c. 642 | 645 | c. 674 | Cenwalh |
| | Cynewise (possibly) | | | – | no earlier than 645 | no later than 648 | – | Penda |
| | Seaxburh | | | – | no earlier than 648 | 672; Thereafter ruled in her own right | c. 674 | Cenwalh |
| | Not reliably recorded. Possibly a sister of Queen Iurminburh. | | | – | no earlier than c. 676 | no later than c. 686 | – | Centwine |
| | Cynethryth | | | – | no earlier than 685 | no later than 688 | – | Cædwalla |
| | Æthelburg | | | – | c. 688 | 726 | – | Ine |
| | Frithugyth | | | – | no earlier than 726 | no later than 740 | – | Æthelheard |
| | Eadburh | Father, King Offa of Mercia; Mother, Queen Cynethryth | before 788 | – | no earlier than 786 | 802 | – | Beorhtric |
| | Unknown; Late recording as Redburga but name is of doubtful historicity | – | – | – | no earlier than 802 | no later than 839 | – | Egbert |
| | Osburh | Father, Oslac | – | before 839 | 839 | no later than 856 | – | Æthelwulf |
| | Judith | Father, Charles the Bald; Mother, Ermentrude of Orléans | October 844 | 1 October 856 | | 13 January 858; Husband's death | after 870 | Æthelwulf |
| | Judith | Father, Charles the Bald; Mother, Ermentrude of Orléans | October 844 | 858 | | 860 | after 870 | Æthelbald |
| | Wulfthryth | – | | | Period 865 to 868 | not after 871 | – | Ethelred I |
| | Ealhswith | Father, Æthelred Mucil. Mother, Eadburh | | 868 | 23 April 871 | 26 October 899 | 5 December 905 | Alfred the Great |
| | Ælfflæd | Father, Æthelhelm | – | circa 901 | | late 910s | after 910 | Edward the Elder |
| | Eadgifu | Father, Sigehelm, Ealdorman of Kent | before 904 | circa 919 | | 17 July 924 | after 965 | Edward the Elder |

== See also ==
- List of monarchs of Wessex

== Bibliography ==
- Stafford, Pauline (1981). "Charles the Bald, Judith and England". In Gibson, Margaret; Nelson, Janet L. (eds.). Charles the Bald: Court and Kingdom. Oxford, UK: B A R. pp. 137–51. ISBN 0-86054-115-0.
- Story, Joanna (2003). Carolingian Connections: Anglo-Saxon England and Carolingian Francia, c. 750–870. Aldershot, UK: Ashgate. ISBN 0-7546-0124-2.
