= Holburn Lake and Moss =

Nature reserve in Northumberland, England

- Location within Northumberland
- Location: Northumberland
- Coordinates: 55.622°N 1.919°W
- Basin countries: England

Designations

Ramsar Wetland
- Official name: Holburn Lake & Moss
- Designated: 17 July 1985
- Reference no.: 302

Holburn Lake and Moss is a nature reserve in Northumberland, England to the east of the village of Holburn. Nearby is St Cuthbert's Cave.

== The lake ==
The lake is artificial and was created in 1934. It supports wintering populations of European importance of greylag geese from the Icelandic population. Birds such as Eurasian wigeon and common teal also roost. There is an area of floating bog to be found along the eastern shore of the lake.

== The moss ==
Holburn Moss is a peat bog, supporting a variety of bog mosses together with other bog plants including heather, cotton grass, cranberry and round-leaved sundew. It has previously been damaged by forestry ploughing.
