= Himegamisha Shrine, Nara =

Shinto shrine in Nara Prefecture, Japan

Himegamisha Shrine (比売神社)
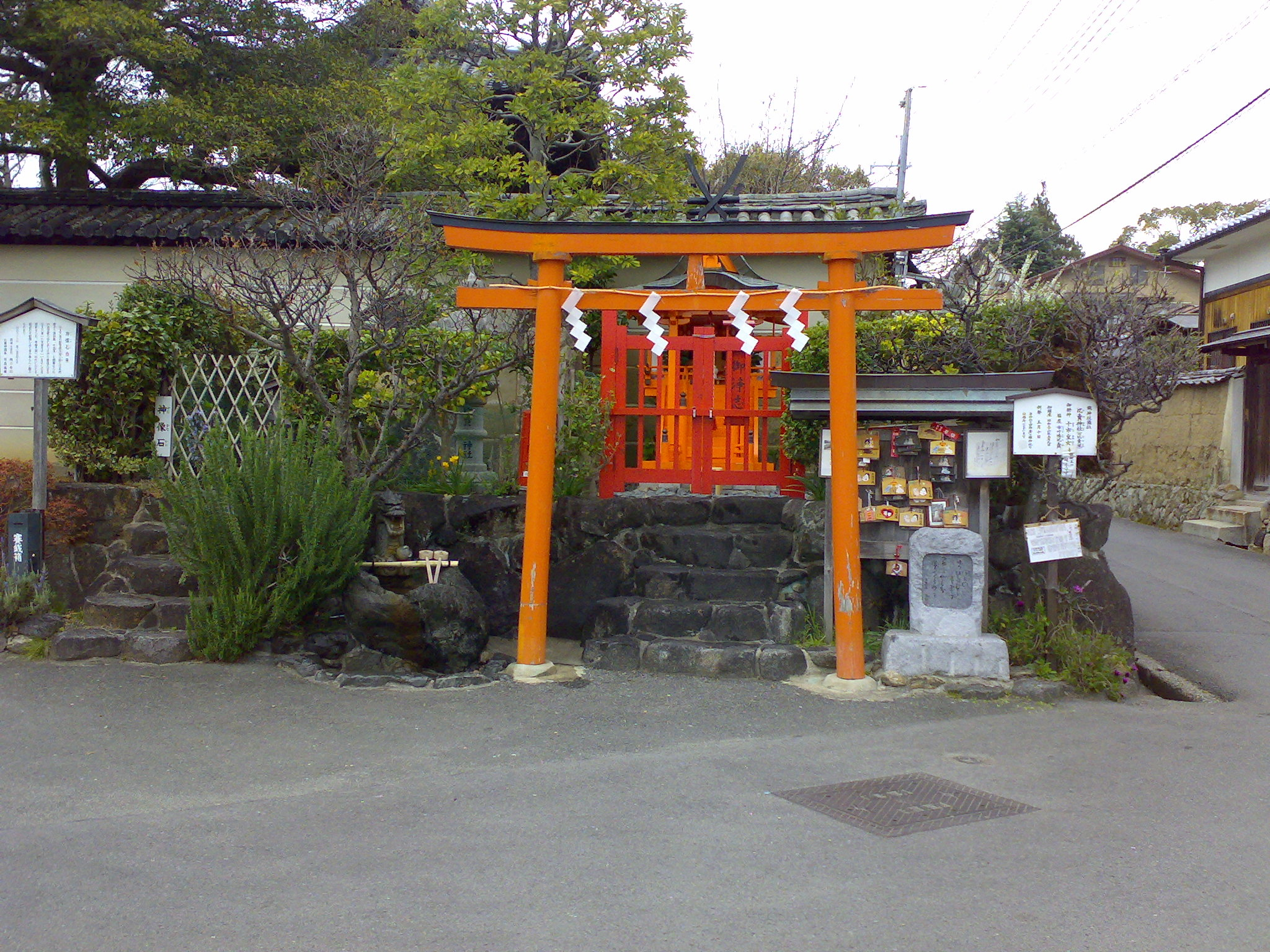
- Himegamisha Shrine

- Location within Japan

Religion
- Affiliation: Shinto

Location
- Coordinates: 34°40′31.54″N 135°50′46.99″E

The Himegamisha Shrine (Japanese: 比売神社, Himegamisha) is a Shinto shrine in the city of Nara, in Nara Prefecture, Japan. It is built in 1981 by the people of this neighborhood on the tomb called Hime-zuka (princess' tomb) that is estimated to be a burial place of Princess Tōchi, an Empress-consort of Emperor Kōbun. It is a sessha (subsidiary shrine) of the Kagami Shrine.

== History ==
In 1930s, the Hime-zuka became nation's property and managed by Nara Bureau of Financial Affairs. Several decades later, this grave was disposed to the residents of this neighborhood. They tried to build a shrine and enshrine Princess Tōchi to it, for the revival of this area. The 320-square-foot (30 m^{2}) land was donated to the Shin-Yakushi-ji temple, and the Shinto ceremonies to be held in the shrine were delegated to the chief priest of the Kagami Shrine.

== Foundation ==
A ground-breaking ceremony was held in the summer of 1980, and a roof-laying ceremony in the end of that year, in cooperation with the Shin Yakushiji Temple and the Kagami Shrine. The shrine building was completed. The celebrating ceremony of enshrinement was held on May 10, 1981, which was the day converted to the solar calendar of the 7th Day of the 4th Month, when the princess died. That was how the shrine was founded.

== Additional images ==
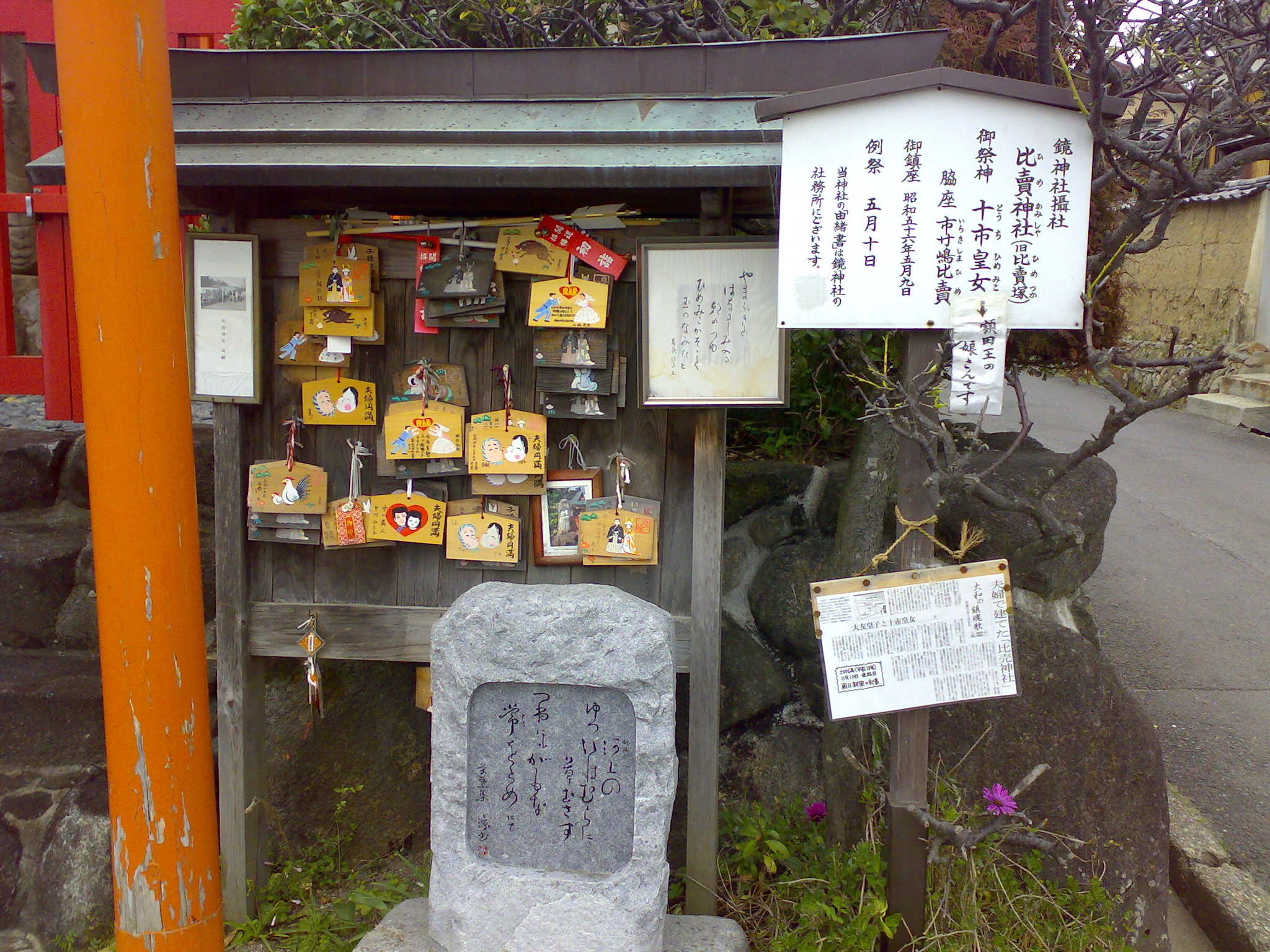
People make wishes for good marriage, and Emas are suspended on the wall.

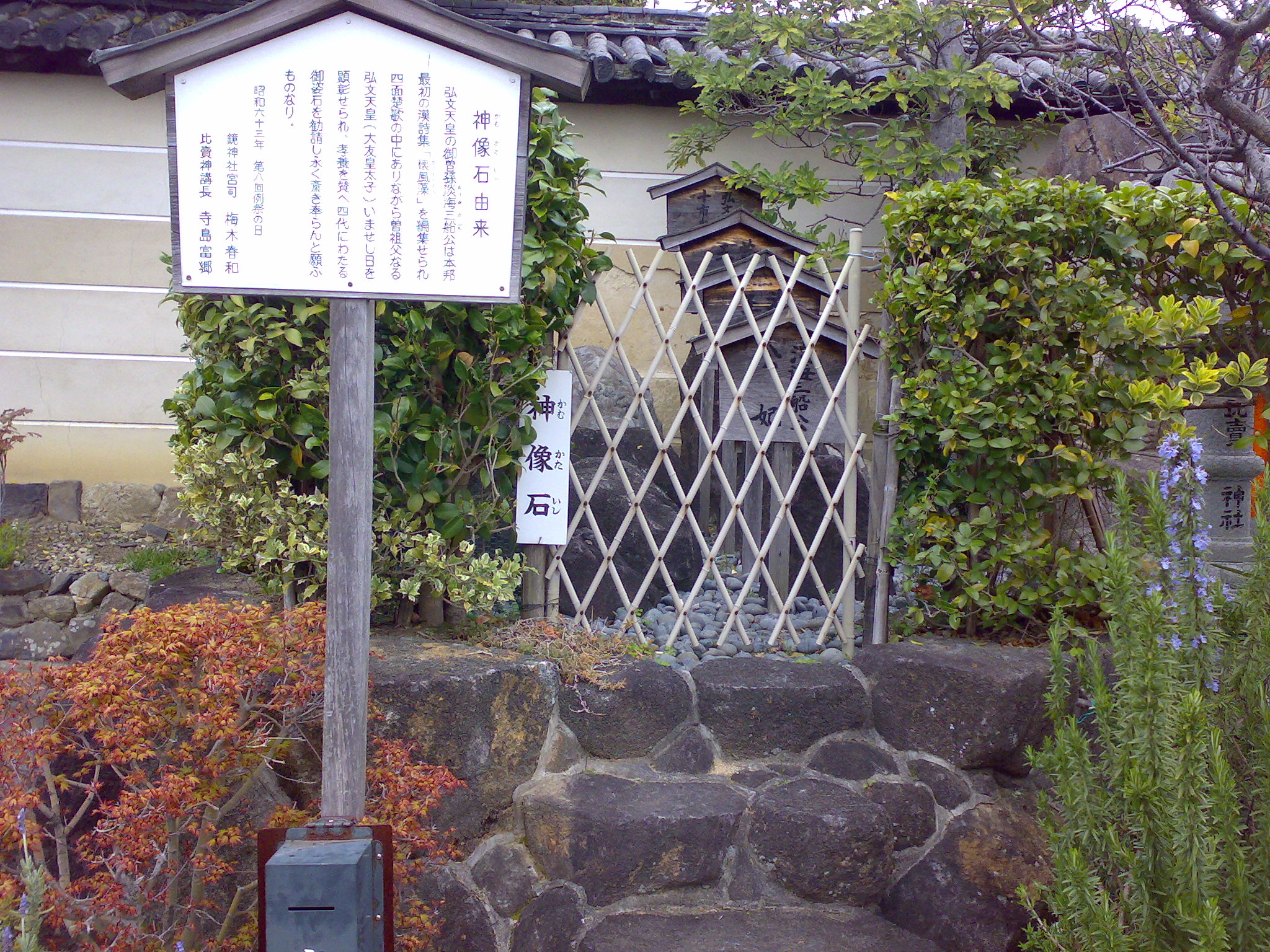
Kamukataishi (deity-imaged stones). In front of a big stone where happy-looking couple is carved, are four stones enshrining Emperor Kōbun down to the three-generations in his lineage.

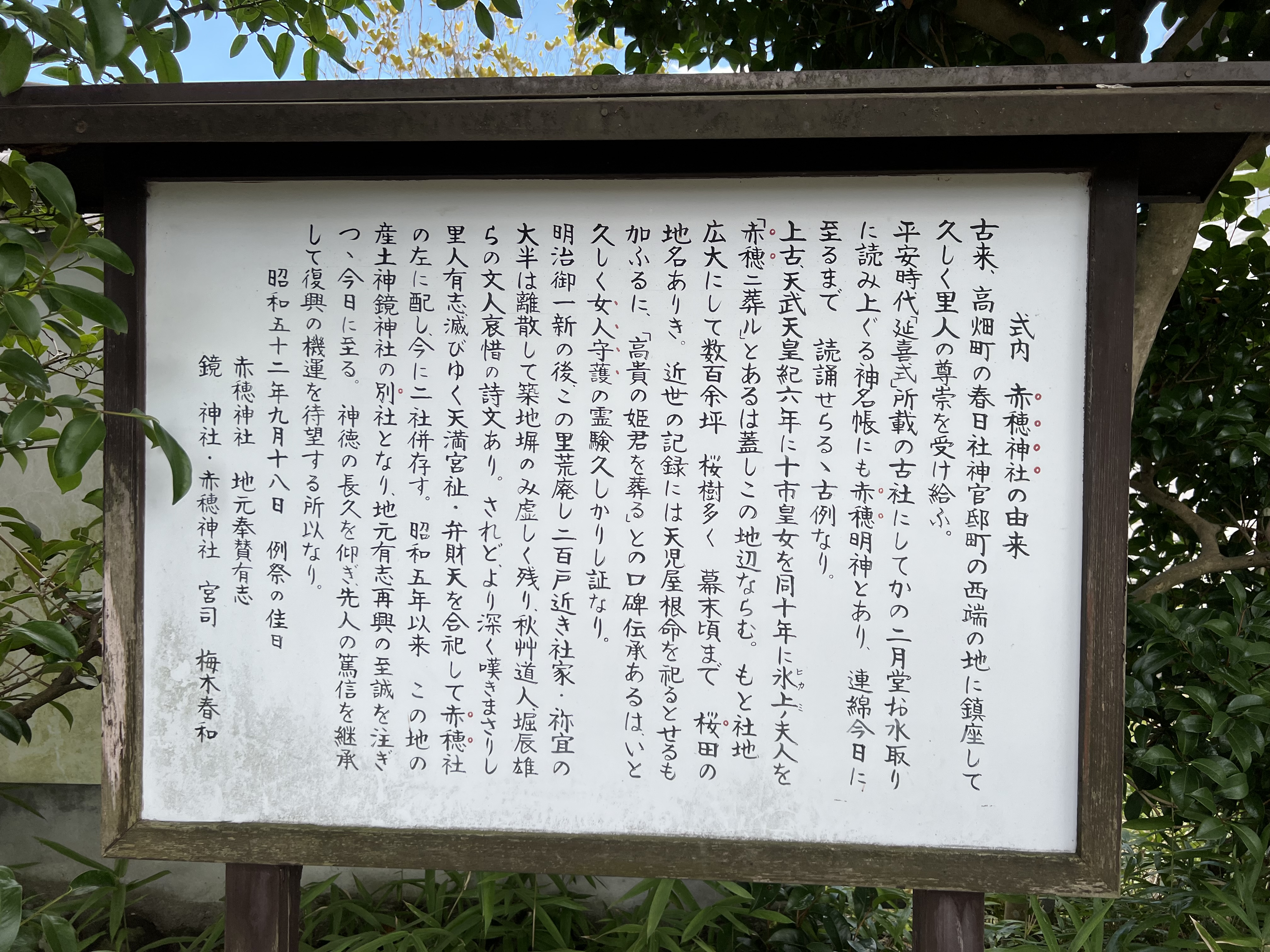
This board is built beside Ako Shrine, saying that Princess Tōchi was buried in Ako, which is presumably this area. Ako Shrine is several hundred feet away from Himegamisha Shrine.
