= Battle of Cirencester =

628 battle in England

Coordinates: 51.719°N 1.968°W

Date	628
Location	Cirencester, Hwicce (in modern-day England)
Result	Mercian victory; Mercia takes control of the Severn Valley and the territory of the Hwicce

Belligerents
Mercia	Gewisse

Commanders and leaders
Penda	Cynegils and Cwichelm

The Battle of Cirencester was fought in 628 at Cirencester in the minor kingdom of the Hwicce. This conflict involved the armies of Mercia, under King Penda, and of Wessex under Kings Cynegils and Cwichelm.

The Anglo-Saxon Chronicle (A) states:

628. Here Cynegils and Cwichelm fought against Penda at Cirencester, and then came to an agreement.

The Chronicle suggests a battle between Anglo-Saxons, in which Wessex was defeated and Mercia took control of the region. However, this is not the first time Anglo-Saxons were recorded in the area : The Anglo-Saxon Chronicle states that Cirencester was under Anglo-Saxon influence since the Battle of Dyrham in 577. However archaeological evidence has not proven a battle on the site took place and suggests gradual absorption with possible Anglo-Saxon settlement near the Roman town from the mid sixth century.
