= Tsutsumori Shrine =

Shinto shrine in Chiba Prefecture, Japan

Coordinates: 35°13′46.5″N 140°9′15.88″E

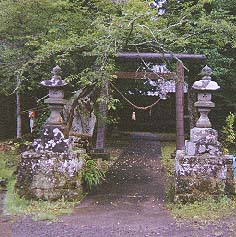
Tsutsumori Shrine

Tsutsumori Shrine (筒森神社, Tsutsumori-jinja) is a Shinto shrine in Ōtaki, Chiba, in Chiba Prefecture, Japan.

A folklore in the Chiba area says that Prince Ōtomo did not die in the Jinshin War and he escaped from the Ōmikyō Palace to the East with his wife, Princess Tōchi. According to the folklore, Princess Tōchi was pregnant and got sick when she arrived to the place named Tsutsumori, and died there because of the illness. People of that place felt sympathy for her and built this shrine commemorating her.

This shrine is propitious for an easy delivery.
