= St Cuthbert's Cave =

Sandstone cave in Northumberland, England

- Cuddy's Cave
- Location: Northumberland

St Cuthbert's Cave, known locally as Cuddy's Cave or Cove, can refer to one of two natural sandstone caves in Northumberland, England, that have been traditionally associated with Saint Cuthbert, the 7th-century Anglo-Saxon monk, bishop and hermit.

== Doddington cave ==
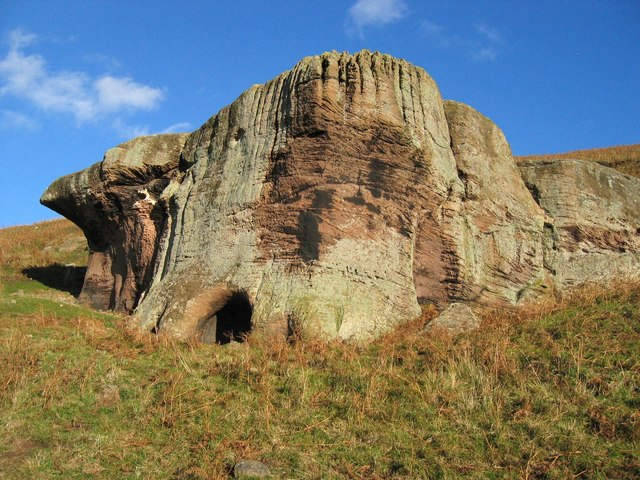
Cuddy's Cave, Doddington Moor, near Wooler

The first cave, in sandstone, is near Doddington in Northumberland. It is a very small cave, which seems to have been artificially enlarged, but there is a tiny natural elliptic tube at the back. Neolithic cup and ring markings, now no longer visible, were sketched there by George Tate in 1865 who wrote that, "On the scalp of the rock where it dips into the hill, four figures are traceable; but from being very much defaced, it is difficult to make out these forms, even when viewed under a favourable light." Recent excavations, revealing extensive cup and ring markings, have been conducted at nearby Dod Law.

The cave's WGS84 coordinates are: 55.572709°N 1.995802°W.

== Holburn cave ==
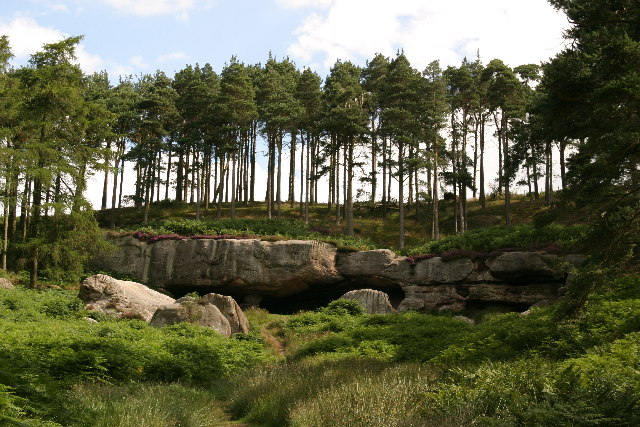
Cuddy's Cave. Holburn, between Belford and Lowick

The second cave, also of sandstone, is in the Kyloe Hills near Holburn, between Belford and Lowick. The woodlands and cave have been the property of the National Trust since 1981. The cave is formed of overhanging rock, sufficiently large to provide shelter for a small group, with a width of 24m and height of 3m. The back wall is 7m from the face and there is a natural rock pillar in the middle of the cave.

The cave's WGS84 coordinates are: 55.610819°N 1.907852°W.

== Legend of St Cuthbert ==
The incorrupt body of Saint Cuthbert

According to the Anglo-Saxon Chronicle, in 875 as the Danes ravaged Lindisfarne and

"... destroyed all the monasteries. Eardulf, bishop of Lindisfarne, and abbot Eadred, taking the body of St Cuthbert from the island of Lindisfarne, wandered about for seven years."

According to legend, these caves might have been among the places in which either the monks took shelter with their holy relic or where Cuthbert himself lived as an anchorite hermit before moving to the Farne Islands.

== See also ==
- Vita Sancti Cuthberti (anonymous)
- Historia de Sancto Cuthberto
