= Princess Nukata =

Japanese poet

Princess Nukata (額田王, Nukata no Ōkimi; dates unknown, possibly fl. 630–690), also spelled Nukada, was a Japanese poet of the Asuka period.

The daughter of Prince Kagami and supposed younger sister of Princess Kagami, Nukata became Emperor Tenmu's favorite wife and bore him a daughter, Princess Tōchi (who would become Emperor Kōbun's consort).

A legend claims that she later became consort to Emperor Tenji, Emperor Tenmu's elder brother, but there is no evidence to support this claim.

== Poetry ==
Nukata was one of the great female poets of her time; thirteen of her poems appear in the Man'yōshū: 7–9, 16–18, 20, 112, 113, 151, 155, 488, and 1606 (poem 1606 is a repeat of 488). Two of the poems are reprinted in the later poetry collections Shinchokusen Wakashū and Shinshūi Wakashū.

=== Poem 8 ===
Nukata composed this poem in c. 661 at the harbor of Nikita-tsu in Iyo Province as an imperial fleet invaded Kyushu:

熟田津に船乗りせむと月待てば
潮もかなひぬ今は漕ぎ出でな
Nikita-tsu ni funa norisemu to tsuki mateba
shio mo kanainu ima wa kogiidena
At Nikita Harbor we have waited for the moonrise before boarding our boats. The tide has risen, now let us row out!
(Man'yōshū 1:8)

=== Poem 9 ===
The ninth poem of the Man'yōshū is known as one of the most difficult poems within the Man'yōshū to interpret. Nukata composed this poem in 658 when Empress Saimei went to a hot spring in Kii Province:

莫器圓隣之大相七兄爪湯氣吾瀬子之
射立爲兼五可新何本
(Man'yōshū 1:9)

A common interpretation for the later part of the poem is by Keichū: ...waga seko ga / i-tataserikemu / itsukashi ga moto (...我が背子がい立たせりけむ厳樫が本), which translates to "...my beloved who stands at the foot of the sacred oak".

The first two lines (莫器圓隣之 大相七兄爪湯氣) has already defeated modern scholarship to date. Some theories include:

- Kaguyama no / kunimi sayakemi (香具山の 国見さやけみ), "I see clearly the country atop mount Kagu, o..." (Kaneko)
- Ki-no-kuni no / yama koete yuke (紀の国の 山越えて行け), "I went and crossed the mountains of Kii province to..." (Kada no Azumamaro, Tachibana Chikage, Mizue Aso)
- sakatori no / ōuna asayuki (坂鳥の 掩ふな朝雪), "The hillside birds have covered the morning snow, o..." (Teiichi Kumekawa)
- shizumarishi / uranami sawaku (静まりし 浦波さわく), "The inlet's once quietened waves have become noisy, o..." (Hisataka Omodaka, Thomas McAuley)
- shizumarishi / taburatsumadachi (静まりし たぶらつまだち), "It's the once-declined trick of standing on one's toes, o..." (Mineko Kawaguchi)
- shizumarishi / rai na nari so ne (静まりし 雷な鳴りそね), "The once quieted thunder has finally roared loudly, o..." (Toshihiko Tsuchihashi)
- nagomarishi / aiau so ake (和まりし 相会ふそあけ), "Our calmed down meetings have widened, o..." (Yamatai association)
- magari no / tabushi mitsutsuyuke (まがりの 田蘆見つつ行け), "I went and saw the twisted field-reeds, o..." (Bunmei Tsuchiya)
- Matsuchi-yama / mitsutsu koso yuke (まつち山 見つつこそ行け), "It is by seeing mount Matsuchi that I walked with..." (Michiyasu Inoue)
- Mimuro-no- / -yama mitsutsu yuke (三室の 山見つつ行け), "I gazed upon and went to the mountains of Mimuro, o..." (Mokichi Saitō)
- Mimoro-no- / -yama mitsutsu yuke (三諸の 山見つつ行け), "I gazed upon and went to the mountains of Mimoro, o..." (Masazumi Kamochi)
- mi-Yoshino-no- / -yama mitsutsu yuke (み吉野の 山見つつ行け), "I gazed upon and went to the mountains of fair Yoshino, o..." (Tokujirō Oyama)
- yūzuki shi / ōinase so kumo (夕月し 覆ひなせそ雲), "The evening moon's light covers the clouds, o..." (Keitsū)
- yūzuki no / kage fumite tate (夕月の 光踏みて立て), "The evening moon's light stands in step, o..." (Sueo Itami)
- yūzuki no / aogite toishi (夕月の 仰ぎて問ひし), "As I looked up the evening moon, I asked..." (Sengaku, Keichū, and Masakoto Kimura)
- yū torishi / iwai shizumuru... (木綿取りし 祝い鎮むる), "As celebration dies down, I took mulberry rope to..." (Kaoru Tani)

According to Alexander Vovin, the first two lines should be read in Old Korean, whereby their meaning is similar to the one proposed by Sengaku:

莫器圓隣之大相七兄爪湯氣我が背子が
い立しけむいつか新顔
nacokʌ-s tʌrari thi-ta-po-n-[i]-isy-a=ca mut-ke waga seko ga
i-tatashikemu itsu ka niigao
After I looked up at the evening moon, I did ask: "My beloved probably went there on a journey. When would I see his face again?"

=== Poem 20 ===
Nukata composed this poem when Emperor Tenji was out hunting in Gamōno (or the field of Une, now part of Ōmihachiman and Yōkaichi, Shiga):

茜草さす紫野行き標野行き
野守りは見ずや君が袖ふる
akane sasu murasakino yuki shimeno yuki
nomori wa mizu ya kimi ga sode furu
Through the shining madder-red murasaki field and through the marked-off field I go. Did not the field-guard see you waving your sleeve [at me]?
(Man'yōshū 1:20)
