= Princess Kagami =

Princess Kagami (鏡王女 Kagami-no-ōkimi) was a Japanese princess and waka poet of the Asuka period.

== Biography ==
It is unknown when the poet known as Princess Kagami was born.

Kamochi Masazumi's Man'yōshū Kogi (万葉集古義) speculates that she was the elder sister of Princess Nukata. She exchanged sōmonka with Fujiwara no Kamatari, and the Kōfukuji Engi (興福寺縁起) records that she was his wife.

She died in 683.

== Poetry ==
Poems 92, 93, 489, 1419, and 1607 in the Man'yōshū are attributed to her.
