= Cuthred =

Cuthred is a given name. Notable people with the name include:

- Cuthred of Kent, ninth-century monarch
- Cuthred of Wessex, eighth-century monarch
- Cuthred son of Cwichelm of Wessex, seventh-century prince of the West Saxons

== See also ==
- MV Cuthred, an Isle of Wight ferry (1969–1990)
