= List of monarchs of Wessex =

This is a list of monarchs of the Kingdom of the West Saxons (Wessex) until 886 AD. While the details of the later monarchs are confirmed by a number of sources, the earlier ones are in many cases obscure.

The names are given in modern English form followed by the names and titles (as far as is known) in contemporary Old English (Anglo-Saxon) and Latin, the prevalent languages of record at the time in England.

This was a period in which spellings varied widely, even within a document. A number of variations of the details below exist. Among these are the preference between the runic character thorn (Þ, lower-case þ, from the rune of the same name) and the letter eth (Ð or ð), both of which are equivalent to modern ⟨th⟩ and were interchangeable. They were used indiscriminately for voiced and unvoiced ⟨th⟩ sounds, unlike in modern Icelandic. Thorn tended to be more used in the south (Wessex) and eth in the North (Mercia and Northumbria). Separate letters th were preferred in the earliest period in Northern texts, and returned to dominate by the Middle English period onward.

The character ⁊ (Tironian et) was used as the ampersand (&) in contemporary Anglo-Saxon writings. The era pre-dates the emergence of some forms of writing accepted today; notably rare were lower case characters, and the letters W and U. W was occasionally rendered VV (later UU), but the runic character wynn (Ƿ or ƿ) was a common way of writing the /w/ sound. Again the West Saxons initially preferred the character derived from a rune, and the Angles/Engle preferred the Latin-derived lettering VV, consistent with the thorn versus eth usage pattern.

Except in manuscripts, runic letters were an Anglian phenomenon. The early Engle restricted the use of runes to monuments, whereas the Saxons adopted wynn and thorn for sounds which did not have a Latin equivalent. Otherwise they were not used in Wessex.

== List ==
Reign	Incumbent	Notes
Kingdom of the Gewissae
Cerdicing dynasty
519 to 534	Cerdic	Possibly Celtic, Brythonic, name. King of Wessex (King of the Gewissae)
534 to 560	Cynric	Son, or according to some sources grandson, of Cerdic.
560 to 591	Ceawlin	Son of Cynric. Possibly Celtic, Brythonic, name.
591 to 597	Ceol	Nephew of Ceawlin, grandson of Cynric.
597 to 611	Ceolwulf	Brother of Ceol, grandson of Cynric.
611 to 643	Cynegils	Sources derive him from Cynric, but name different dynasty members as his father. Possibly Celtic, Brythonic, name
c. 626 to 636	Cwichelm	Co-ruler with Cynegils, perhaps his son of this name.
643 to 645	Cenwalh	Son of Cynegils. Possibly Celtic, Brythonic, name; Deposed
Mercian dynasty
645 to 648	Penda	King of Mercia, expelled Cenwalh.
Cerdicing dynasty
648 to 672	Cenwalh	Restored; reigned until his death in 672
672 to 674	Seaxburh	Only queen regnant, ruled after her husband's death.
674	Cenfus	(Disputed) Perhaps reigned between Seaxburh and his son Æscwine. Given a remote descent from Cynric.
674 to 676	Æscwine	Son of Cenfus.
676 to 685	Centwine	Traditionally son of Cynegils, but this is disputed. Deposed by Cædwalla
Kingdom of the West Saxons
Cerdicing dynasty
685 to 688	Cædwalla	Perhaps descendant of Ceawlin. Usurper; abdicated, possibly of British origin.
688 to 726	Ine	Descendant of Ceawlin. Abdicated
726 to 740	Æthelheard	Perhaps brother-in-law of Ine.
740 to 756	Cuthred	Relative, possibly brother, of Æthelheard.
756 to 757	Sigeberht	Distant relative of Cuthred. Deposed (and killed?) by Cynewulf
757 to 786	Cynewulf	Assassinated by Cyneheard, who was the brother of Sigeberht. Direct descendant of Cerdic.
786 to 802	Beorhtric	Possible direct descendant of Cerdic. Son-in-law of Offa of Mercia.
802 to 839	Ecgberht	Descendant of Ine's brother.
839 to 858	Æthelwulf	Son of Ecgberht.
858 to 860	Æthelbald	Son of Æthelwulf.
860 to 865	Æthelberht	Son of Æthelwulf.
865 to 871	Æthelred I	Son of Æthelwulf.
871 to 886	Alfred the Great	Son of Æthelwulf. The only English monarch to be given the epithet "the Great".

== Family tree ==
The chart shows their (claimed) descent from the traditional first king of Wessex, Cerdic, down to the children of Alfred the Great. A continuation of the tree into the 10th and 11th centuries can be found at English monarchs family tree.

The tree is largely based on the late 9th-century Anglo-Saxon Chronicle, the West Saxon Genealogical Regnal List (reproduced in several forms, including as a preface to the [B] manuscript of the Chronicle), and Asser's Life of King Alfred. These sources are all closely related and were compiled at a similar date, and incorporate a desire in their writers to associate the royal household with the authority of being a continuation of a unified line of kingship descended from a single original founder.

One apparently earlier pedigree survives, which traces the ancestry of King Ine back to Cerdic. This first appears in a 10th-century manuscript copy of the "Anglian collection" of Anglo-Saxon royal genealogies. The manuscript is thought to have been made at Glastonbury in the 930s during the reign of King Æthelstan (whose family traced their own royal descent back to Cerdic via a brother of King Ine), but the material may well date back to the earliest reconstructable version of the collection, c. 796; and possibly still further back, to 725–726. Compared to the later texts, this pedigree gives an ancestry for Ceolwald as son of Cuthwulf son of Cuthwine which in the later 9th-century texts sometimes seems confused; and it states Cynric as son of Creoda son of Cerdic, whereas the Chronicle annals go to some length to present Cerdic and Cynric as a father-and-son pair who land in and conquer the southern part of Wessex together (a narrative now considered spurious by historians).

Wessex Family Tree

The red border indicates the monarchs
The thick border indicates the close relatives of the monarchs (parents, spouses and children)

Parentheses around regnal ordinal number indicates a queen

Asterisk (*) after regnal ordinal number indicates a disputed reign

Cerdic d. 534; 1st King of Wessex; 519–534
Cynric d. 560; 2nd King of Wessex; 534–560
Ceawlin d. 593; 3rd King of Wessex; 560–592	Cutha ?	Ceolwulf ?
Cuthwine b. 565	Ceol d. 597; 4th King of Wessex; 592–597	Ceolwulf d. 611; 5th King of Wessex; 597–611	Cuthgils ?
Cynebald ?	Cedda c. 590?	Cuthwulf fl. 592–648	Cynegils d. 643; 6th King of Wessex; 611–643	Pybba d. c. 606–615; King of Mercia; 593–c. 606–615	Cenferth ?
Cenberht c. 620–661	Ceolwald ?	Cwichelm d. 636; 7th King of Wessex; 625–636	Centwine d. 685; 13th King of Wessex; 676–685	Seaxburh d. c. 674 (11th) Queen of Wessex c. 672 – c. 674	Cenwalh d. 674; 8/10th King of Wessex; 642–645–648–683	sister of Penda ?	Penda c. 606–655; 9th King of Wessex; 645–648	Eowa ?	Cenfus d. 674; 12th* King of Wessex; 674
Cædwalla c. 659–689; 14th King of Wessex; 685–688	Mul d. 687; King of Kent; 686–687	Cenred ?	Cuthred b. before 639–661	Osmod ?	Æscwine d. 676; 12th King of Wessex; 674–676
Ingild ?	Ine c. 670–after 726; 15th King of Wessex; 689–726	Æthelburg ?	Æthelheard d. 740? 16th King of Wessex; 726–740	Cuthred d. 756; 17th King of Wessex; 740–756	Eanwulf ?
Eoppa ?	Sigeberht ? 18th King of Wessex; 756–757	Cyneheard d. 786	Cynewulf d. 786; 19th King of Wessex; 757–786	Thingfrith ?
Eafa ?	Offa d. 796; King of Mercia; 757–796
Ealhmund c. 745–827; King of Kent; 784	Beorhtric d. 802; 20th King of Wessex; 786–802	Eadburh fl. 787–802
Ecgberht c. 770–839; 21st King of Wessex; 802–839
Judith c. 843–870	Æthelwulf c. 795–858; 22nd King of Wessex; 839–858	Osburh ?
Æthelstan d. c. 852; King of Kent; 839–851	Æthelbald c. 831–860; 23rd King of Wessex; 858–860	Æthelberht c. 835–865; 24th King of Wessex; 860–865	Æthelred I c. 847–871; 25th King of Wessex; 865–871	Alfred the Great c. 848–849–899; 26th King of Wessex; 871–c. 886; 1st King of the Anglo-Saxons c. 886–899
English monarchs family tree

== Use of Celtic names ==
The name of the Bretwalda Ceawlin, rendered 'ceaulin', as it appears in the Anglo-Saxon Chronicle (C-text)

The Wessex royal line was traditionally founded by a man named Cerdic, an undoubtedly Celtic name cognate to Ceretic (the name of two British kings, ultimately derived from *Corotīcos). This may indicate that Cerdic was a native Briton and that his dynasty became anglicised over time.

A number of Cerdic's alleged descendants also possessed Celtic names (see the list above), including the 'Bretwalda' Ceawlin. The last man in this dynasty to have a Brittonic name was King Caedwalla, who died as late as 689.

This is seen as evidence for a British influence on the emerging Anglo-Saxon elite classes within the ongoing debate about whether the Romano-Britons were forcefully expelled or gradually assimilated by the Anglo-Saxon settlement of Britain.

== See also ==
- List of royal consorts of Wessex
- Governors of Roman Britain
- List of legendary kings of Britain
- Anglo-Saxon royal genealogies
- List of English Monarchs
