= Holburn =

Hamlet in Northumberland, England

Coordinates: 55.622°N 1.930°W

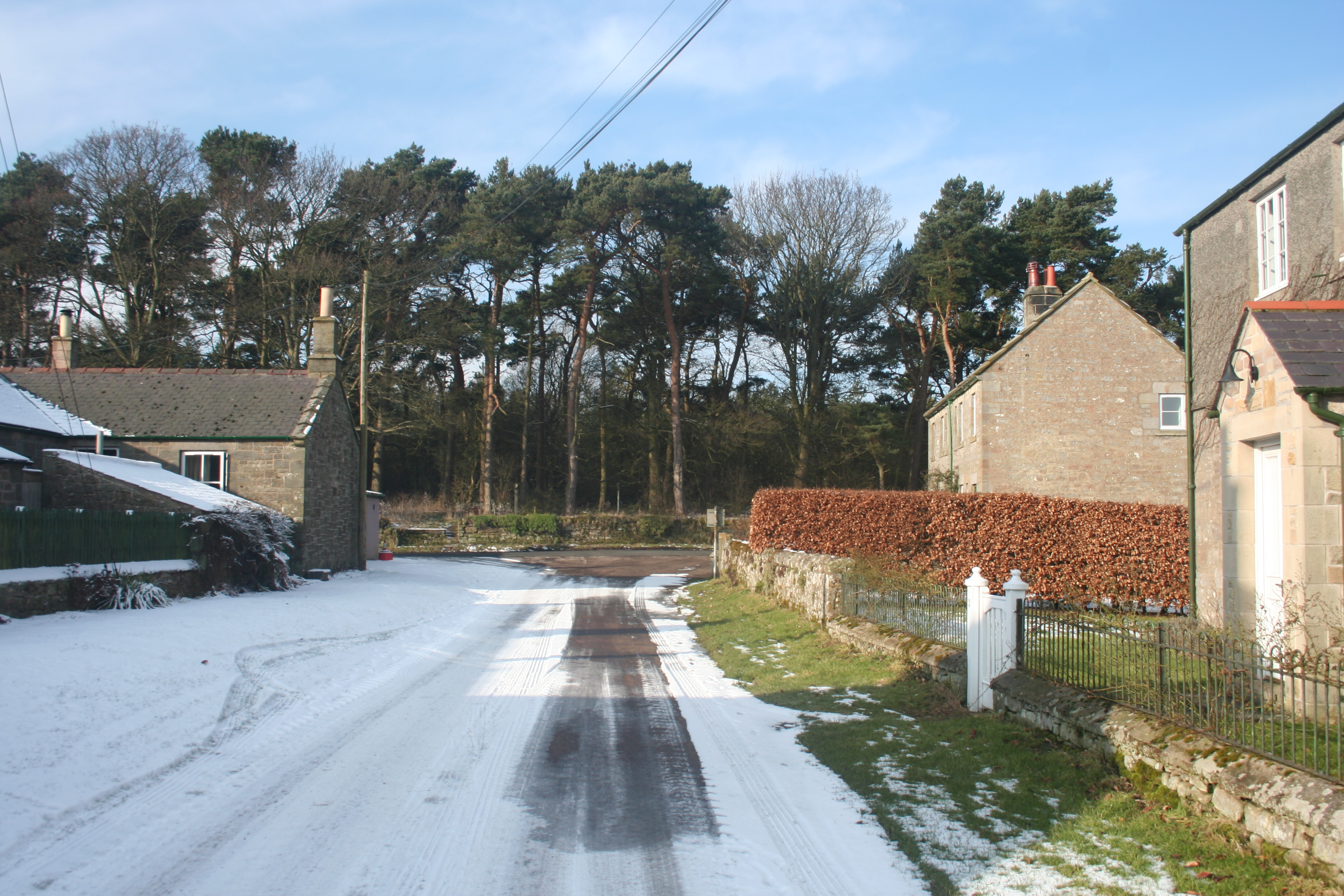

- Location within Northumberland
- OS grid reference: NU040361
- Civil parish: Lowick
- Unitary authority: Northumberland
- Ceremonial county: Northumberland
- Region: North East
- Country: England
- Sovereign state: United Kingdom
- Post town: BERWICK-UPON-TWEED
- Postcode district: TD15
- Dialling code: 01289
- Police: Northumbria
- Fire: Northumberland
- Ambulance: North East
- UK Parliament: North Northumberland

Holburn is a small hamlet in the civil parish of Lowick, in the English county of Northumberland. Holburn is located between Lowick and Belford. The hamlet is known for its rural charm and proximity to natural features such as Holburn Lake and Moss.

== Governance ==
Holburn is in the parliamentary constituency of Berwick-upon-Tweed.

== See also ==
- Holburn Lake and Moss
