= Princess Tōchi =

Royal consort of Japan (d. 678)

Tōchi

Empress consort of Japan
- Tenure: January 672 – 21 August 672
- Born: c. 648/653; Nara, Japan
- Died: 3 May 678 (aged 25–30); Asuka Kiyomihara Palace, Asuka, Nara, Japan
- Burial: Ako, Japan
- Spouse: Emperor Kōbun
- Issue: Prince Kadono
- House: Yamato
- Father: Emperor Tenmu
- Mother: Princess Nukata

Princess Tōchi (十市皇女; c. 648/653 – 3 May 678) was a Japanese imperial princess during the Asuka period who was Empress of Japan as the wife of her cousin Emperor Kōbun. Her name Tōchi is derived from the Tōchi district, a neighbourhood located a few miles north of Asuka. Princess Tōchi was daughter of Emperor Tenmu and Princess Nukata. She married Prince Ōtomo, who became Emperor Kōbun. They lived in the capital of Ōtsu in the Ōmi Province (currently Ōtsu, Shiga). He succeeded after his father, Emperor Tenji, died. She subsequently was consort until Emperor Kōbun was killed by her father in the Jinshin War.

After the war, she returned to Asuka and lived with her mother and her son in the Asuka Kiyomihara palace. In 675 she visited the Ise Grand Shrine with Princess Abe.

In 678, she was appointed a Saiō by divination and was supposed to leave her residence to stay in Saikū (斎宮) in the 7th day of the 4th month, when she suddenly died in the residence. Upon her death, Prince Takechi composed three verses of lamentation in her honour (from his verses collected in Man'yōshū).

She was buried at a place mentioned as Akō in the Nihonshoki.

== Early years ==
Tōchi was the only daughter of Prince Ōama, later Emperor Tenmu, and one of his wives, Princess Nukata, daughter of Prince Kagami and known as a renowned court poet. Prince Ōama was a younger brother of Prince Naka-no-Ōe, who killed his political enemies, Soga no Iruka and Soga no Emishi, with one of his servants, Nakatomi no Kamatari, and set up the Taika Reform in 645. Prince Ōama divorced Nukata to let her be a wife of Naka-no-Ōe, who liked and wished to marry her. As Prince Naka-no-Ōe gained political power, Ōama could not refuse what his brother wanted to do.

Tōchi grew up at a house where her mother lived. It was not a typical manner for Imperial children of this era to spend their childhood with their mothers. Normally, they were supposed to be raised by nursing ladies at different places from where their mothers were.

It is said that she was getting along well with Prince Takechi, one of her near-in-age half-brothers with different mothers, and some historians even say that she was in love with him.

== At the court of Ōtsukyo: 667–672 ==
In 665, Tōchi was arranged to marry her father's nephew, Prince Ōtomo, a young man who was several years older than she. His father, Prince Naka-no-Ōe, removed the capital of Japan from Asuka to Ōtsukyo in the Ōmi Province (today in Otsu, Shiga Prefecture) on 17 April (the 19th day, the 3rd month) 667 and acceded to the Imperial throne (Emperor Tenji) in 668, wishing him to be the next Emperor. However, he was not qualified for succession as his mother was not an Imperial origin. On the other hand, Tōchi's father continued his political career under Emperor Tenji. Prince Ōama's political skills attracted many supporters.

Tōchi gave birth to a son, named Prince Kadono, in 669.

Soon after Prince Ōtomo was appointed to Daijō-daijin in 671, Emperor Tenji was ill in bed. When he was dying, he called Prince Ōama to his death bed and asked him to become the next Emperor. As Prince Ōama feared to risk his life threatened by Ōtomo's supporters if he accepts it, he refused his brother's proposal. He got his head shaved, became a Buddhist monk and moved to a temple in Yoshino to show that he did no longer have an intention to stick to any political position. Emperor Tenji died on the third day, 12th month of 671, without appointing anyone to his successor.

After Emperor's death, Tōchi's husband acceded to the throne and became the next Emperor (Emperor Kōbun), although there's no record of his enthronement ceremony. She followed him as the Empress. Maybe that was the most successful time in her life.

== The Jinshin War: 672 ==
During this time, Tōchi's father, Prince Ōama, lived in retirement as a monk in Yoshino. Still, he secretly collected weapons so that he could take his revenge on Emperor Kōbun and his administration when he was ready. The administration took action to send the troops to Yoshino to assassinate him. As Tōchi was worried that her father might be killed, she secretly informed it of him by writing a letter in small piece of paper and pushing it into the belly of a grilled crucian sent to him as gift.

In the sixth month of 672, Prince Ōama left Yoshino with his supporters and proceeded eastwards to collect soldiers. He summoned two of his sons, Prince Takechi and Prince Ōtsu, to join him. He took up his position at Wazamigahara, and raised his army against the government in the first day, the seventh month.

Prince Takechi, Tōchi's ex-boyfriend, played a leading role in attacking the government's troops. She was confused of the situation where her husband and her beloved man were fighting each other.

The war lasted about a month. His army finally burnt the palace down. Emperor Kōbun was driven away from the palace and escaped with few retainers to Mount Nagara near the palace to look for the place of committing suicide as it was considered as a shame that the noble man was killed by somebody who was in lower position in the battlefield. Emperor ceremonially hanged himself in the mountain before being killed by the enemy. Tōchi and her family were captured and sent to Asuka, where her father acceded to the throne and built a new palace.

== Life under Emperor Tenmu: 672–678 ==
Although Tōchi was the consort of the enemy of the new Japan's leader, she wasn't punished at all. Instead, she and her family were protected within the palace her father built.

Many historians and novelists say that she met her beloved ex-boyfriend Prince Takechi again and they both had a happy romantic time during this time. At the same time, she felt guilty for her late husband. People blamed her for her unfaithfulness to him. Her father, being a new leader, was afraid that his family member's misconduct might have given a negative impact to his new administration and his country. He told the two to break up. They didn't want to do it, but disobeying the Emperor's words meant treason. Seeing, dating and loving of the two had to be kept secret after that.

=== Visit to Ise ===
According to Nihonshoki, she followed Princess Abe to Ise Grand Shrine in the second month of 675. Mistress Fufuki, one of her lady's maids, found that Tōchi sometimes felt blue on her way to Ise. She composed a tanka to console her:

On seeing the crags on the long mountain flanks of Hata when Princess Tōchi made a pilgrimage to Ise Shrine:

The thrusting, clustered

Boulders on the riverbank

Bear no trace of grace:

Forever young, I too would be

A maiden till the end of time.

The tanka means Fufuki's wish to stand by Tōchi with sorrow as a faithful servant till the end of time. She prayed for her to be an eternal pure-and-young girl without any sorrow or agony.

=== Appointment to Saiō ===
In spite of her supporters' wishes, Emperor tried to keep her away from her boyfriend. In 678, he issued an edict to tell her to be in a Shinto convent as a Saiō, who is considered as a servant for the god so marrying a man and meeting male people were strictly forbidden. That meant that she had no chances to meet Takechi any longer.

=== Death and burial ===
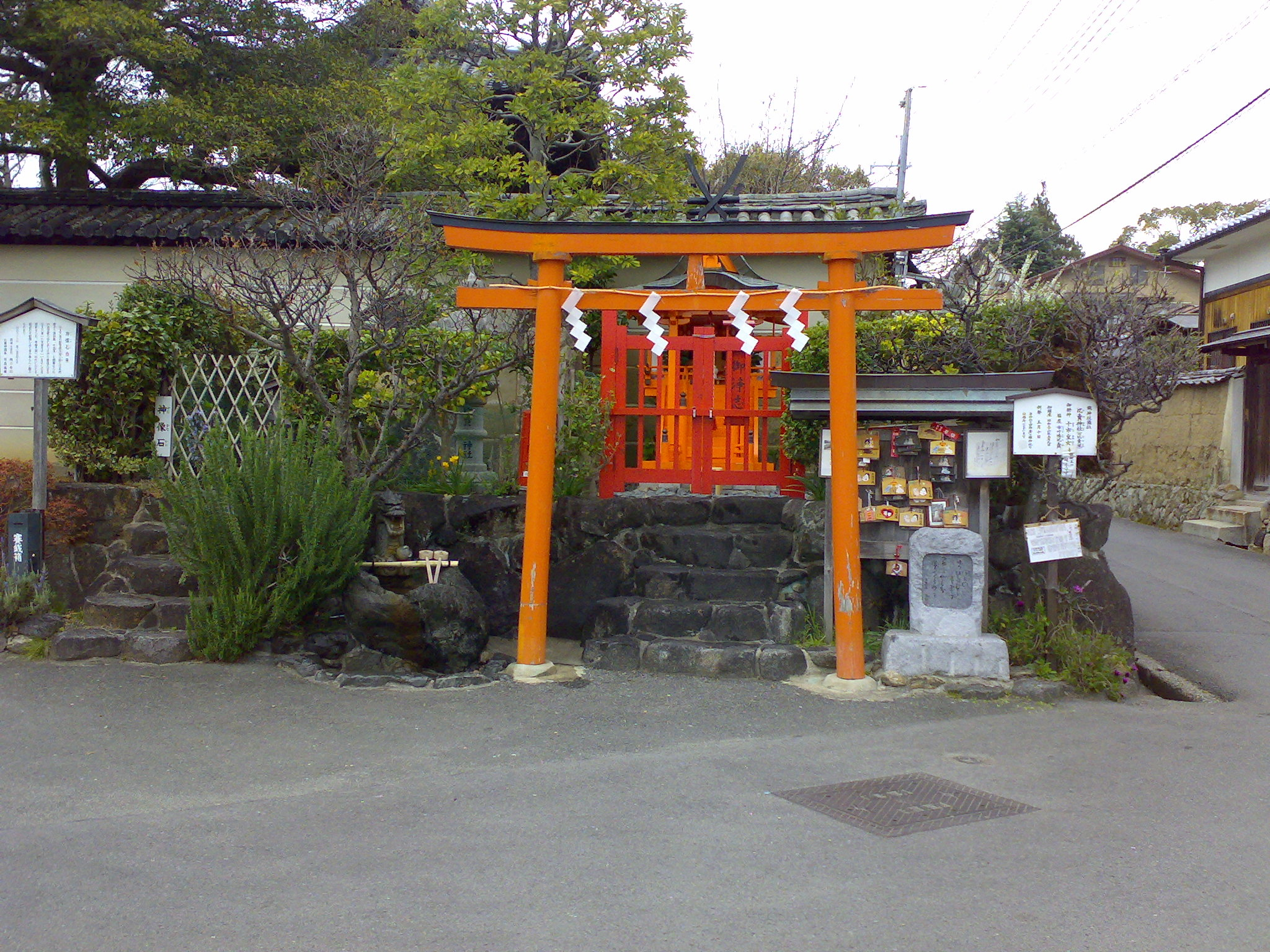
Himegamisha Shrine

On the 7th day, 4th month of 678, the very day when she was supposed to be in the convent, she suddenly came down with a disease and died in the palace. Emperor felt guilty and grieved very much. Some historians insist that she was murdered for some reason, and others say that she committed suicide because of mental illness.

Her body was buried at Ako, not precisely known where it is. One of expected burial places is Himezuka (Princess' Tomb) in Nara, where Himegamisha Shrine was built in 1981.

Prince Takechi left his lament in his poems, which were collected in Manyoshu.

== Legends ==
Some legends and stories about Princess Tōchi have survived throughout Japan. One is that she was pregnant in the time of the Jinshin War, escaped to the east with Prince Ōtomo who was not killed at Otsu, and arrived together in the Kazusa province, where her husband was killed by a party of pursuers and she went deep into the mountains to the Tsutsumori neighbourhood where she died after miscarriage. Local people of the neighbourhood felt pity for her, built a shrine and enshrined her spirit. The shrine is Tsutsumori Shrine, located in Ōtaki, Chiba Prefecture.

Shingū Shrine in Nankoku, Kōchi Prefecture also has a legend about her, which has never been disclosed to public.

== Genealogy ==
Princess Tochi was born in the imperial family of Japan to Emperor Tenmu and his concubine, Princess Nukata.She married Emperor Kōbun, Emperor Tenji's son, and become his legal wife.The couple had only one son who died at the age of 7.

Name	Birth	Death	Notes
Prince Kadono	January 669	9 January 706	Grandfather of Omi no Mifune
