= Seaxburh of Wessex =

Queen of Wessex from 672 to 674

Seaxburh

Queen of Wessex
- Reign: c. 672 – c. 674
- Predecessor: Cenwalh
- Successor: Æscwine

Consort of the King of Wessex
- Died: c. 674
- Spouse: Cenwalh

Seaxburh ([ˈsæ͜ɑks.burˠx]; died c. 674) was a queen of Wessex. She is also called Queen of the Gewisse, an early name for the tribe which ruled Wessex. She is said to have ruled Wessex for between one and two years after the death of her husband, Cenwalh, in 672. Her accession to the throne is documented in the Anglo-Saxon Chronicle for that year which states that "This year king Kenwalk died, and Sexburga his queen reigned one year after him". It was extremely rare for a woman to reign suo jure in Anglo-Saxon England, and she was the only woman to appear in a regnal list. She may have reigned for over a year, as the next reign is entered in the Anglo-Saxon Chronicle in 674.

However, Bede said that after the death of Cenwalh, "sub-kings took upon themselves the government of the kingdom", so the chroniclers may have tidied up a complicated situation. Writing decades after Cenwalh's life, when Bede lists Cenwalh's accession, he mentions Seaxburh as the unnamed second wife whom the king married after he had cast away his first wife, who was the sister of the Mercian king Penda. It has been suggested that Bede deliberately omitted mention of Seaxburh because he viewed her marriage to Cenwalh, and therefore her right to the throne, as illegitimate.

Seaxburh was succeeded in about 674 by Æscwine, a descendant of Cenwalh's great-uncle Ceolwulf of Wessex.

== See also ==
- House of Wessex family tree

== Notes ==
Regnal titles
Preceded by Cenwalh as King of Wessex	Queen of Wessex c. 672 – c. 673	Succeeded by Æscwine as King of Wessex
