= Æscwine of Wessex =

King of Wessex from 674 to 676

Æscwine
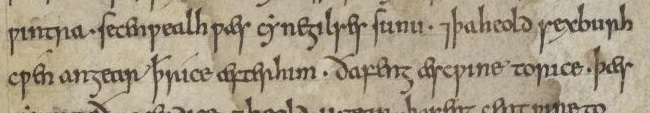
- Fragment of the Anglo-Saxon Chronicle that mentions Æscwine

King of Wessex
- Reign: 674–676
- Predecessor: Seaxburh
- Successor: Centwine
- Died: After 676
- House: Wessex
- Father: Cenfus

Æscwine was a King of Wessex from about 674 to 676, but was probably not the only king in Wessex at the time.

Bede writes that after the death of King Cenwalh in 672: "his under-rulers took upon them the kingdom of the people, and dividing it among themselves, held it ten years". According to the Anglo-Saxon Chronicle Cenwalh was succeeded as ruler for about one year by his wife Seaxburh. Æscwine reigned from about 674 to 676. Another source claims that Æscwine's father, Cenfus (Old English: Cēnfūs), ruled for two years after Seaxburh.

The Anglo-Saxon Chronicle supplies a genealogy, making him a fifth-generation descendant of Cynric. Bede's dismissal of Æscwine as a mere sub-king may represent the views of the supporters of the King Ine of Wessex, whose family ruled Wessex in Bede's time, as Ine's family were bona fide descendants of Cynric through Ceawlin's son Cuthwine.

In 675, Æscwine defeated an invasion of Wessex led by the Mercian King Wulfhere at Biedanheafde, a location which has not been certainly identified.

Æscwine was succeeded by Centwine of Wessex.

== External links and bibliography ==
- Kirby, D. P (1992). The Earliest English Kings (Reprint ed.). London: Routledge. ISBN 9780415090865.
- Æscwine 2 at Prosopography of Anglo-Saxon England

Regnal titles
Preceded by Seaxburh as Queen of Wessex	King of Wessex; 674–676?	Succeeded by Centwine
