= Lowick, Northumberland =

Village in Northumberland, England

Coordinates: 55.649°N 1.977°W

Lowick
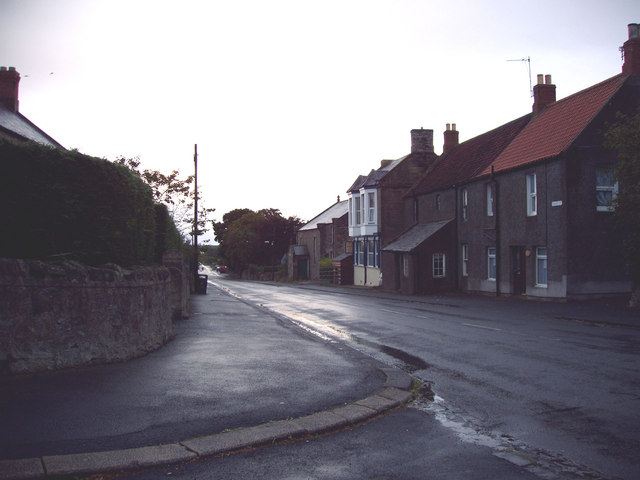
- Main St, Lowick - Looking East

- Location within Northumberland
- Population: 552 (2011 census)
- OS grid reference: NU015395
- Unitary authority: Northumberland
- Ceremonial county: Northumberland
- Region: North East
- Country: England
- Sovereign state: United Kingdom
- Post town: BERWICK-UPON-TWEED
- Postcode district: TD15
- Dialling code: 01289
- Police: Northumbria
- Fire: Northumberland
- Ambulance: North East
- UK Parliament: North Northumberland

Lowick (/ˈlaʊɪk/) is a village in Northumberland, north east England. Lowick lies on the B6353 road, about 10 miles (16 km) south of Berwick-upon-Tweed. The Anglican St John the Baptist's Parish Church dates from 1794, but a chapel was built in the 12th century by monks of Lindisfarne. The Grade II* listed Barmoor Castle, a castellated Tudor-style country house, is about a mile to the west of the village.

Lowick, Northumberland should not be confused with Lowick, Northamptonshire.

== History ==
Lowick appears in records in 1181 as Lowich, and in 1242 as Lowyc. The Devil's Causeway Roman road passes through the village. It was later used by monks travelling from Lindisfarne to Durham.

In 1851 the village had a population of 720 people, growing to 1,310 by 1891.

== Geography ==
Lowick is on the B6353 road, about 10 miles (16 km) southwest of Berwick-upon-Tweed and 11 miles (18 km) east of Cornhill-on-Tweed, and 8.5 miles (13.7 km) to the northeast of Wooler. Impure carboniferous limestone is found in the area.

== Economy ==
The parish of Lowick has traditionally grown barley, oats, peas, beans and turnips. Coal pits and stone quarries are in the area. There are numerous guesthouses and old farm buildings converted into cottages catering for tourists.

== Landmarks ==
The monks of Lindisfarne built a chapel in the 12th century. The Anglican parish church dedicated to St John the Baptist dates from 1794, although its register dates from 1720 in an earlier building. The church was renovated and altered in 1887 by F. R. Wilson, a contractor for the Percy family, Earls and Dukes of Northumberland. The Scottish congregation, in existence since 1662 when it was formed by Reverend Luke Ogle, is one of the oldest non-conformist in England.

The village has two public houses, the Black Bull and the White Swan, and a village shop. Barmoor Castle, a country house about a mile to the west, was built in 1801 by Patterson of Edinburgh in the castellated Tudor style using older materials. Three storeys high, with a four-storey central porch tower and six-panelled door, with several oval-shaped rooms in the interior, it became a Grade II* listed building in 1986. Moss Hall, to the southwest along the B6525 road, is run as a B&B.
