= Prince Ōtomo =

Ruler of Japan in 672

Prince Ōtomo 大友皇子
- Great King of Yamato (disputed)
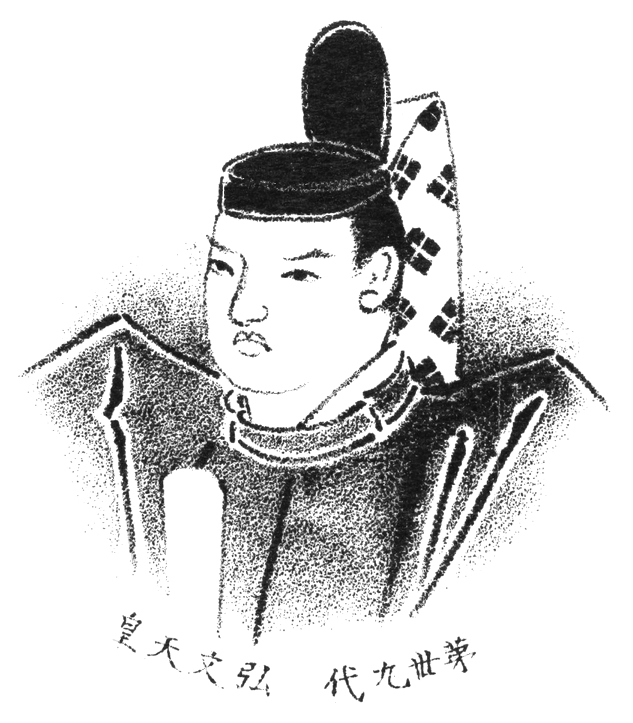
- 1894 illustration of Kōbun

Emperor of Japan (disputed)
- Reign: 672
- Predecessor: Tenji
- Successor: Tenmu
- Born: Iga (伊賀); 648
- Died: 672 (aged 23–24)
- Spouse: Princess Tōchi
- Issue: Prince Kadono
Posthumous name
- Emperor Kōbun (弘文天皇)
- House: Imperial House of Japan
- Father: Emperor Tenji
- Mother: Yakako no Iratsume

Prince Ōtomo (648–672), also known under the posthumous title Emperor Kōbun (弘文天皇), was a Japanese noble who briefly ruled over the imperial court in 672, during the Jinshin War of the late Asuka period. He was born as Prince Iga to Prince Naka no Ōe. Iga changed his name to Ōtomo and married his cousin Princess Tōchi. After several years as regent, Naka ascended to the throne as Emperor Tenji in 668. He appointed either his son Ōtomo or brother Ōama as his heir. He also appointed Ōtomo as the first Daijō-daijin ('prime minister'), overseeing the Daijō-kan ('council of state').

Following Tenji's death in 671, a succession dispute broke out between Ōtomo (residing at court in Ōmi) and Ōama (who had traveled to Yoshino, possibly suspecting a plot against him). Fearing an attack by Ōtomo's forces, Ōama fled and rallied soldiers across the eastern province in mid-672, beginning the Jinshin War. A month later, Ōama's forces routed those of the Ōmi court. Ōtomo is said to have fled to the mountains and committed suicide, although he may have instead been betrayed by his minister Mononobe no Maro. Ōama ascended to the throne as Emperor Tenmu and returned the capital to Asuka. The poetry anthology Man'yōshū avoids direct mention of Ōtomo, although a poem attributed to him is included in another anthology, the Kaifūsō. No sources prior to the 10th century describe him as having been enthroned as emperor. The compilers of the 18th century chronicle Dai Nihonshi named him as an emperor, a historiographical position adopted by the Japanese government in 1870. Following this, he was granted the posthumous name Kōbun.

== Early life ==
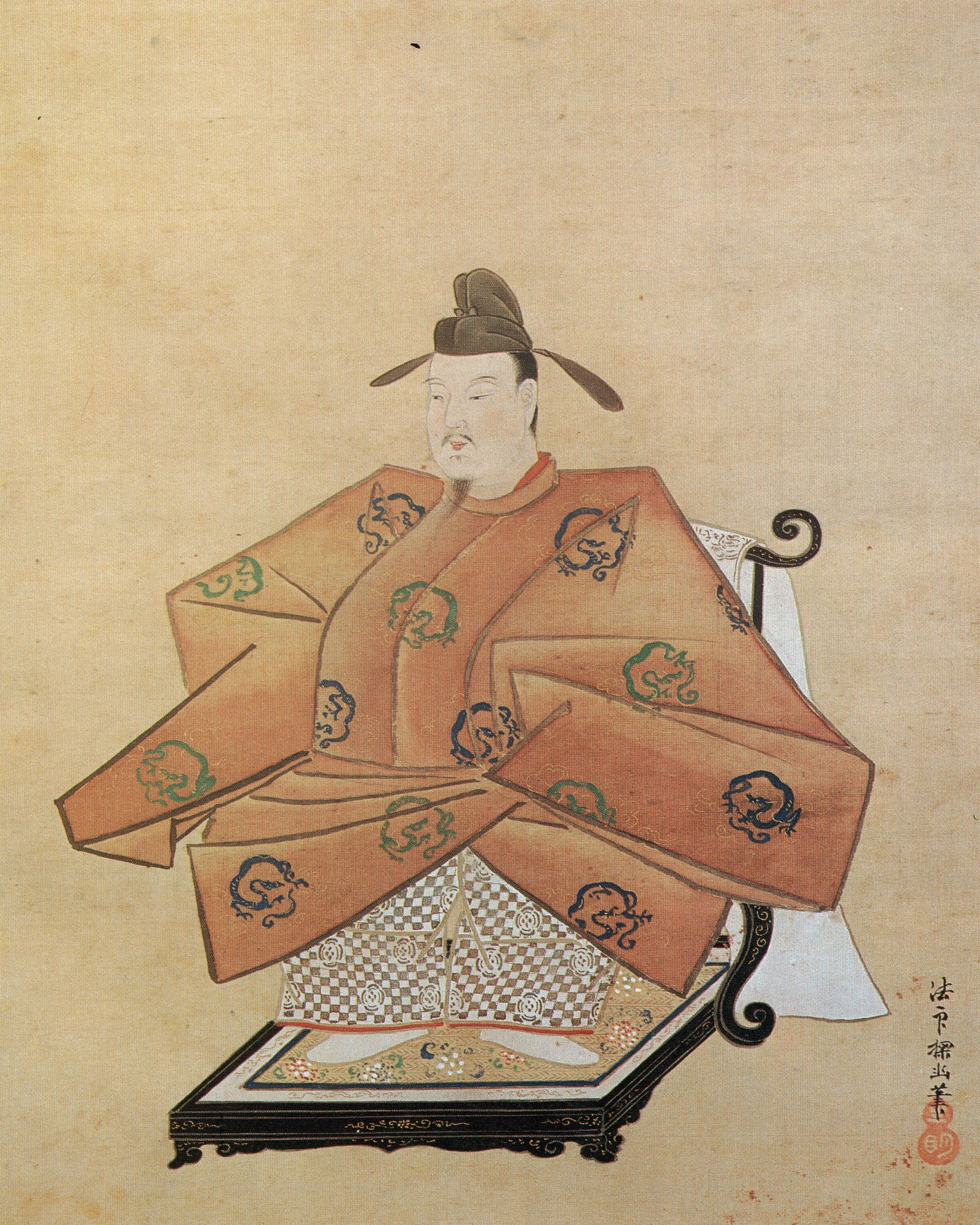
17th-century illustration of Ōtomo's father Naka no Ōe (later known as Emperor Tenji)

Prince Ōtomo was born as Prince Iga (伊賀) in 648, the son of Prince Naka no Ōe. Prince Naka was the son of two Japanese sovereigns, Emperor Jomei (r. 629–641) and Empress Kōgyoku (r. 642–645, 655–661). He had become the heir to the throne and a powerful statesman after the Isshi incident in 645, where he led a coup to assassinate the aristocrat Soga no Iruka. Prince Iga's mother, Yakako no Iratsume, was one of Prince Naka's concubines, more specifically an uneme (采女). A local noble had granted Yakako to Naka, and she was the lowest-ranking of Naka's eleven wives. She hailed from Iga Province, from which her son received his name. Considered unflattering, this name was later changed to Ōtomo (大友) after a minor aristocratic family. Although pronounced identically, this was a distinct lineage from the prominent Ōtomo clan (大伴).

Prince Ōtomo married Princess Tōchi, the daughter of Naka's younger brother, Prince Ōama, with Princess Nukata, a noblewoman and poet who may have later married Prince Naka. Ōtomo and Tōchi had a son, Prince Kadono. Prince Naka became regent after his mother's death in 661, but did not ascend to the throne as Emperor Tenji until 668, following the move of the imperial capital from Asuka in Yamato Province to Ōtsu in Ōmi Province. Imperial chronicles such as the Nihon Shoki describe Tenji's reign as a golden age of culture and prosperity, and portray him as a key figure to the Taika Reform, a period of administrative reforms which begun in 645.

In 671, Tenji appointed Ōtomo as the inaugural Daijō-daijin ('prime minister'), presiding over the newly established Daijō-kan ('Council of State'). Although this title would later become the highest title within the state administration, it did not yet have such a high connotation, but may have indicated that Ōtomo would serve as Tenji's successor. The same year, a new system of court ranks—the cap ranks—was promulgated. This is generally attributed to Prince Ōama, but a variant of the Nihon Shoki instead attributes this reform to Prince Ōtomo.

The Nihon Shoki is unclear on whether Ōtomo or Ōama served as heir to the throne under Tenji. Ōtomo would have held less legitimacy, being the son of a lower-ranking concubine (as opposed to Ōama, the son of two sovereigns). The chronicle refers to Ōama as the heir most frequently, referring to him under titles such as Eastern Prince (東宮). However, the Nihon Shoki was compiled by Ōama's son Prince Toneri, who would have sought to boost his father's prestige and legitimacy in the succession.

Tenji fell gravely ill in 671. Different chapters of the Nihon Shoki give contradicting accounts of the events around his death and succession, portraying Tenji and Ōama alternatively as allies or rivals. The Tenji volume states that Tenji summoned Prince Ōama on his deathbed and offered him the throne. Ōama refused on the grounds of poor health, and suggested that Tenji's consort Yamato-hime instead serve as empress regent, with Ōtomo as the state minister. The volume then states that Prince Ōama gained his permission to leave the capital and become a Buddhist monk. In contrast, the Tenmu (Ōama) volume states that the minister Soga no Yasumaro warned Ōama to "think carefully before you speak" prior to the meeting, leading him to suspect that the offer of the throne was in reality a plot against him. Tenji died in the last month of 671. As he was on his deathbed, the Nihon Shoki relays that Ōtomo and the five other members of the Daijō-kan gathered in a temple at the imperial palace and swore an oath to an image of the Buddha, declaring him the protector of the realm and vowing to follow his and the Emperor's wishes.

== Reign and war ==
Although the imperial court in Ōmi recognized Ōtomo as Tenji's successor, it is unclear if he was ever enthroned; he may have simply controlled affairs as the designated heir, possibly with his stepmother Yamato-hime as an uncrowned empress regnant. Nakatomi no Kane served as Ōtomo's Minister of the Right. The Ōmi court suspected a conspiracy on Ōama's part, and cut him off from receiving supplies from the capital. In the sixth month of 672, Ōama received a report from his political allies in Mino Province that Ōtomo was plotting to attack him, and fled east on horseback alongside his family and a small group of retainers, beginning a succession conflict known as the Jinshin War.

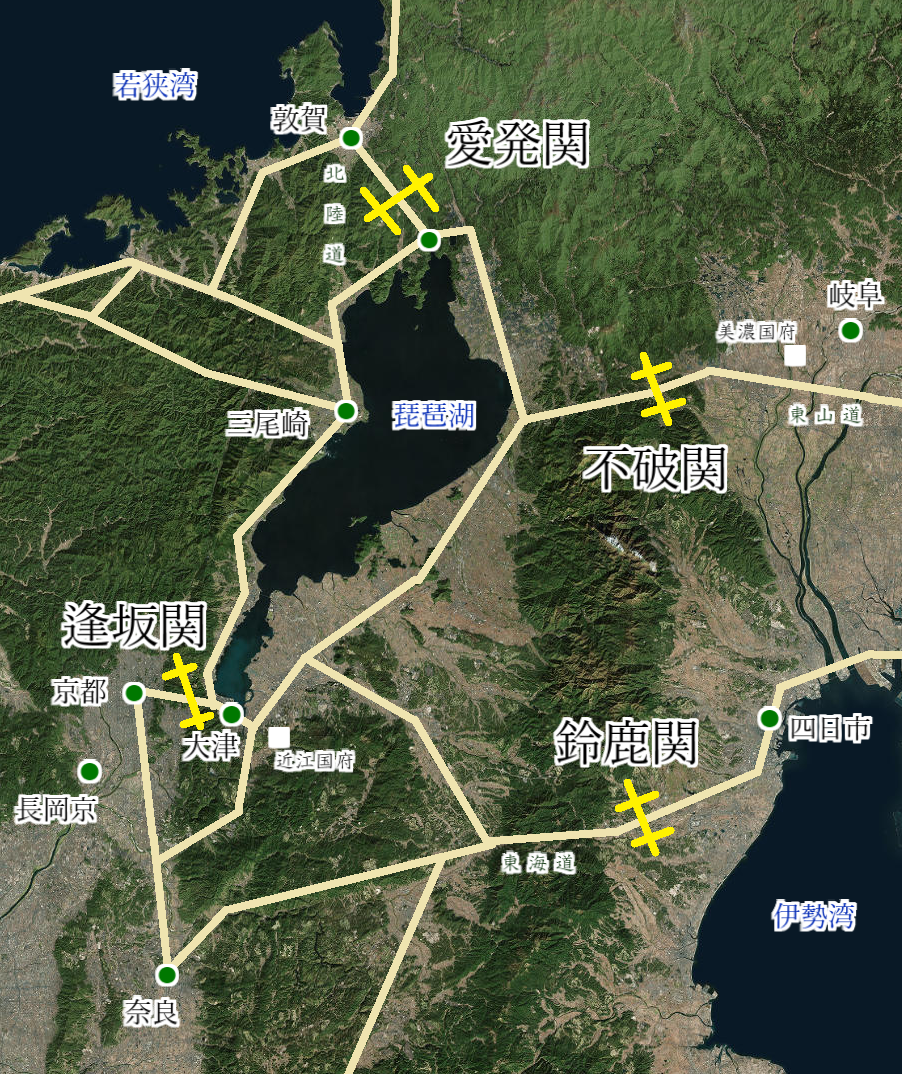
Japanese map of locations in ancient eastern Kansai. The Suzuka Barrier is marked at the bottom-right, with Fuwa Pass above it. Ōmi is marked at the southern end of Lake Biwa.

Most provincial governors were appointed directly by the Ōmi court, and recognized Ōtomo instead of Ōama. Ōtomo received support from the Soga clan and several generals from the former Korean kingdom of Paekche, who had fled to Japan followed a failed attempt to restore the kingdom in 662. The presence of these Paekche generals may have driven their rivals, the Ōtomo clan, to support Prince Ōama; however, the Ōtomo clan's opposition led the Mononobe to support Prince Ōtomo.

Ōama was also supported by the Yamato no Aya, a clan of immigrant nobles. Ōtomo's government supported maintaining favorable relations with the Tang dynasty, while Ōama sought to cut ties with the Tang and instead move closer to the Korean kingdom of Silla. Upon fleeing east, Ōama was supported by the governor of Ise, who closed the Suzuka Barrier, one of two mountain passes allowing access to the eastern provinces. Officials in Owari and Mino provinces, and possibly the governors of Shinano and Kai, also backed Ōama.

While Ōama was able to gain a significant amount of support in the north and east, Ōtomo's Ōmi court struggled to secure reinforcements from the western and southern provinces. Several governors refused to send him forces, claiming that they were needed to protect from a potential invasion. However, some may have simply believed that Ōtomo was unlikely to win the conflict. Despite this, Ōmi forces were able to push back a contingent of Ōama's troops in Yamato early in the seventh month of 672. After this, Ōama split his main force into three armies: the largest marched through Fuwa Pass and along the southern shore of Lake Biwa, another went along the north of the lake, and the last retreated back through Mino and Ise to reinforce the troops in Yamato. Although shaken by a night cavalry raid, Ōama's largest army routed Ōtomo's forces at Seta, just to the southeast of Ōmi.

The Nihon Shoki reports that Ōtomo's remaining generals abandoned him and he fled to the mountains, committing suicide by strangulation in the 7th month of 672. He was accompanied by his minister Mononobe no Maro (later known as Isonokami) and one or two attendants. As Maro continued to serve and receive promotions under future rulers, some historians have suspected that Maro may have actually betrayed Ōtomo by killing him or revealing his location to Ōama's forces. Ōama executed or banished most of Ōtomo's top officials (mostly inherited from Tenji's government), but pardoned many of the lesser ministers of the Ōmi court.

== Legacy and historiography ==
Following Ōtomo's defeat, Ōama took the throne and reigned as Emperor Tenmu. He dismantled the Omi capital and returned the imperial court to Asuka. Ōtomo's son Kadono continued to serve as a prince of the imperial family under the reigns of his successors, and was consulted by Empress Jitō in 696 to discuss the line of succession to the throne.

A poem in the Kaifūsō, an 8th century Chinese-language poetry anthology, is credited to Ōtomo. This poem praises the status of the Japanese sovereigns, and is among the first to describe them using language used to describe Chinese emperors, with terms such as huang (皇, 'sovereign') and di (帝, 'emperor'). He is not mentioned by name within the Man'yōshū, another 8th century poetry anthology. One poem in the Man'yōshū, an elegy for Tenmu's son Prince Takechi, refers to the Ōmi court forces as the "unruly peoples" from "defiant lands" rather than naming Ōtomo. However, the collection includes a poem about his wife Tōchi, and describes her becoming an "eternal maiden" after visiting the Ise Shrine, perhaps representing her purification from the marriage to Ōtomo.

In the 10th century, during the Heian period, the statesman Minamoto no Taka’akira wrote in his diary Saikyūki the earliest known claim that Ōtomo had succeeded to the throne as emperor between the reigns of Tenji and Tenmu. This was supported by the compilers of the Dai Nihonshi in the 18th century. The government of Emperor Meiji officially recognized Ōtomo as an emperor in 1870, granting him the posthumous name Emperor Kōbun.

Regnal titles
Preceded by Emperor Tenji	Emperor of Japan: Kōbun; 672 (disputed)	Succeeded by Emperor Tenmu
