= Cwichelm of Wessex =

King of Wessex from 626 to 636

Cwichelm
- A map of Britain c. 600 when Cwichelm ruled

King of Wessex
- Reign: 626–636
- Predecessor: Cynegils
- Successor: Cenwalh
- Died: 636
- House: Wessex

Cwichelm ([ˈkwik.heɫm] QUICK-helm; died c. 636) was an Anglo-Saxon king of the Gewisse, a people in the upper Thames area who later created the kingdom of Wessex. He is usually counted among the Kings of Wessex.

== Life ==
Cwichelm is first mentioned in the Anglo-Saxon Chronicle for 614: "This year Cynegils and Cwichelm fought at Beandun, and slew two thousand and forty-six of the Welsh."

Bede records that the attempted assassination of King Edwin of Deira, circa 626, was ordered by the West Saxon King Cwichelm, and does not mention Cynegils. In 628, Cynegils and Cwichelm fought King Penda at Cirencester. The Chronicle could be expected to report a victory, but does not, so it is likely that Penda was the victor.

The last mention of Cwichelm is for 636, when the Chronicle records: "This year King Cwichelm was baptized at Dorchester, and died the same year." Cynegils was also baptised at this time, by Bishop Birinus, with Oswald of Bernicia as his godfather. The final entry in the Anglo-Saxon Chronicle concerning Cwichelm, in 648, states: "This year Cenwalh gave his relation Cuthred three thousand hides of land by Ashdown. Cuthred was the son of Cwichelm, Cwichelm of Cynegils." Cuthred may have been a sub-king under Cynegils and Cenwalh.

== Relationship to Cynegils ==
The relationship of Cwichelm to Cynegils, and the question of whether King Cwichelm was a son of Cynegils is disputed. In the 648 entry originally referring to Cuthred, son of Cwichelm, son of Cynegils, the use of the Latin term propinquus (relation, kinsman) rather than nepos (grandson, nephew) is perhaps surprising. Barbara Yorke accepts that there was a single Cwichelm, and that he was Cynegils' son. D.P. Kirby notes that the evidence is weak, confused, and shows signs of later changes to the record. The evidence that Cwichelm was king of the Gewisse is unassailable, but the question of his ancestry and relationship to Cynegils, if any, is much less certain.

== See also ==
- House of Wessex family tree
