= 680s =

Decade

The 680s decade ran from January 1, 680, to December 31, 689.

== Events ==
=== 680 ===
==== By place ====
====== Byzantine Empire ======
- Byzantine–Bulgarian War: The Bulgars under Asparukh subjugate the country of current-day Bulgaria, north of the Balkan Mountains. Emperor Constantine IV leads a combined land and sea operation against the invaders and besieges their fortified camp in Dobruja.
- Battle of Ongal: The Byzantine army (25,000 men) under Constantine IV is defeated by the Bulgars and their Slavic allies in the Danube Delta. Bulgar cavalry force the Byzantines into a rout, while Constantine (suffering from leg pain) travels to Nesebar to seek treatment.

====== Europe ======
- King Wamba is deposed after an 8-year reign, and forced to retire to a monastery. He is succeeded by Erwig who becomes ruler of the Visigothic Kingdom.
- King Perctarit makes his son Cunipert co-ruler of the Lombard Kingdom. He signs a formal peace treaty with Constantine IV.
- Pippin of Herstal becomes Mayor of the Palace of Austrasia.
- The emporium (market town) of Dorestad is founded near the mouth of the Rhine, and soon becomes a major trading settlement in the North Sea region (approximate date).

====== Britain ======
- King Cædwalla of Wessex becomes overly ambitious in a power-struggle with his rival, King Centwine, for Wessex overlordship. He is banished into the forests of Chiltern and Andred.

====== Arabian Empire ======
- Yazid I, son of Muawiyah I, becomes the sixth caliph (second Umayyad caliph) but Kufans in Mesopotamia rebel and invite Hussein ibn Ali (grandson of Muhammad) to take the throne.
- October 10 – Battle of Karbala: Forces under Yazid I kill Hussein ibn Ali and his closest supporters. This event leads to the civil war known as the Second Fitna.

====== Asia ======
- In Japan, Princess Uno Sarara is unwell, and Emperor Tenmu begins the erection of the Temple of Yakushi-ji (Nara Prefecture). He makes 100 people enter religion as priests, wishing her to recover her health.

==== By topic ====
====== Religion ======
- September 17 – Theodore of Tarsus, archbishop of Canterbury, convenes a synod at Hatfield that clears the English Church from any association with the heresy of monothelitism.
- November 7 – The Third Council of Constantinople (Sixth Ecumenical Council) opens in Constantinople to settle the theological controversies of monoenergism and monothelitism, ending September 16, 681.
- Wilfrid returns to Northumbria, with papal support, but is imprisoned by King Ecgfrith, and again exiled. He travels to the Kingdom of Sussex and begins to evangelise the people.
- King Merewalh of Magonsæte founds the monastery of Wenlock Priory in Shropshire, England, appointing his daughter Milburga as Benedictine abbess.
- Approximate date
  - Boniface begins his education at an English Celtic Christian monastery, probably in Exeter near his birthplace and one of many monasteriola built by local landowners and churchmen.
  - The Book of Durrow is created, probably in Northumbria or on the island of Iona in the Scottish Inner Hebrides.

=== 681 ===
==== By place ====
====== Byzantine Empire ======
- Byzantine–Bulgarian War: Emperor Constantine IV is forced to acknowledge the Bulgar state in Moesia, and to pay protection money to avoid further inroads into Byzantine Thrace. Consequently, Constantine creates the Theme of Thrace of the Byzantine Empire (located in the south-eastern Balkans).
- Autumn – A military revolt breaks out in the Anatolic Theme (modern Turkey). The Byzantine army marches to Chrysopolis, and sends a delegation across the straits of the Hellespont to Constantinople, demanding that the two brothers should remain co-emperors alongside Constantine IV.
- September/November – Constantine IV has his brothers Heraclius and Tiberius mutilated, so they will be unable to rule. He orders that their images no longer appear on any coinage, and that their names be removed from official documentation.
- Constantine IV agrees to a compromise, and persuades the army to return to their barracks in Anatolia. He invites the leaders of the rebellion to come to Constantinople and consult the Senate as to how to implement the terms. On their arrival, he arrests the leaders and has them hung at Sycae.

====== Europe ======
- January 9 – Twelfth Council of Toledo: King Erwig of the Visigoths initiates a council, in which he implements diverse measures against the Jews. Laws against violence to slaves are suppressed.

====== Britain ======
- King Æthelwalh of Sussex gives Wilfrid, exiled bishop of York, lands in Selsey to found a cathedral, named Selsey Abbey.
- King Ecgfrith of Northumbria requests that the monks of Monkwearmouth found a new monastery at Jarrow (or 682).

====== Arabian Empire ======
- A Muslim Arab army led by Uqba ibn Nafi reaches Morocco, before being forced back into Cyrene by the Berbers.
- Armenians, Albanians, and Iberians rise in rebellion against the Umayyad Caliphate (approximate date).

====== Asia ======
- In Japan the Asuka Kiyomihara Code is commenced under Emperor Tenmu.
- Kutluk Khan revolts and establishes the Second Turkic Khaganate.
- Kusakabe, second son of Tenmu, is made crown prince.
- Sinmun becomes king of the Korean kingdom of Silla.

==== By topic ====
====== Religion ======
- January 10 – Pope Agatho dies at Rome of plague after a 2½-year reign, in which he has persuaded Constantine IV to abolish the tax heretofore levied at the consecration of a newly elected pope.
- September 16 – The Sixth Ecumenical Council (see 680) ends at Constantinople. The council reaffirms the Orthodox doctrines of the Council of Chalcedon in 451, and condemns monothelitism.

=== 682 ===
==== By place ====
====== Europe ======
- King Erwig of the Visigoths continues oppression of the Jews in Spain. He makes it illegal to practice any Jewish rites (brit milah), and presses for the conversion or emigration of the remaining Jews.
- Gistemar becomes mayor of the palace in Neustria and Burgundy, after he deposes his father Waratto. He reverses the peace treaty with Austrasia, signed with Pepin of Herstal at Namur.
- King Ecgfrith requests Benedict Biscop to build a second monastery at Jarrow (Northumbria). Benedict leaves Monkwearmouth with 20 monks, (including his protégé, the young Bede).
- The West Saxons, led by King Centwine, drive the Britons of Dumnonia (West Country) to the sea (possibly around Bideford).
- The wandering ex-Wessex sub-king, Cædwalla, seeks St. Wilfrid as his spiritual father, but does not convert to Christianity.
- Bridei III, King of the Picts, campaigns violently against Orkney.

====== Africa ======
- At about this time, Muslim Umayyad Caliphate forces led by Uqba ibn Nafi overrun the south coast of the Mediterranean Sea. He occupies the cities of Tripoli and Carthage, the last Byzantine bases in Africa. In 682 or 683 the Umayyads are ambushed at the Battle of Vescera near Biskra (modern Algeria) by Romano-Berbers of King Caecilius and their Byzantine allies from the Exarchate of Carthage. Uqba ibn Nafi is killed and his army evacuates the city of Kairouan in Tunisia and withdraws to Barca.

====== Asia ======
- Due to a culmination of major droughts, floods, locust plagues and epidemics, a widespread famine breaks out in the dual Chinese capital cities of Chang'an (primary capital) and Luoyang (secondary capital). The scarcity of food drives the price of grain to unprecedented heights, ending a once prosperous era under emperors Taizong and Gaozong on a sad note.
- Emperor Tenmu issues a decree forbidding the Japanese-style cap of ranks and garments, and changing them into Chinese ones. He also makes a decree forbidding men to wear leggings and women to let down their hair on their backs. It is from this time, that the practice begins of women riding on horseback like men. He issues an edict prescribing the character of ceremonies and language to be used on occasions of ceremony. Ceremonial kneeling and crawling are both abolished, and the ceremonial custom of standing at the Tang court is practiced.

====== Mesoamerica ======
- Jasaw Chan Kʼawiil I starts to rule in Tikal (modern Guatemala) during the Late Classic period.
- Bʼalaj Chan Kʼawiil begins a program to inscribe monuments recording his travails and ultimate victory, during the Second Tikal–Calakmul War.

==== By topic ====
====== Astronomy ======
- January 3 – Venus occults Jupiter.

====== Literature ======
- The first entry is made in the Welsh chronicle Brut y Tywysogion.

====== Religion ======
- August 17 – Pope Leo II succeeds Agatho as the 80th pope, after a period of sede vacante ("vacant seat") of a year and 7 months.

=== 683 ===
==== By place ====
====== Britain ======
- King Sighere of Essex dies after a 19-year joint reign. His brother Sæbbi becomes the sole ruler of Essex until his death in 694.

====== Arabian Empire ======
- Second Fitna:
  - August 26 – The Battle of al-Harra is fought between forces of the Umayyad Caliphate and the rebel defenders of Medina at a lava field northeast of the city.
  - September–November – Siege of Mecca: The Umayyad army led by Husayn ibn Numayr al-Sakuni besieges Mecca, during which the Kaaba ("Sacred House") catches fire and is burned down.
  - November 14 – Caliph Yazid I dies at Damascus, after a 3-year reign marked by civil war. He is succeeded by his son Muawiya II as ruler of the Umayyad Caliphate.

====== Asia ======
- December 27 – Emperor Gaozong dies at Luoyang, age 55, after a 34-year reign in which he expanded the Chinese Empire by acquiring Korea as a vassal state.
- Emperor Tenmu decrees a reform in Japan; copper coins must be used instead of silver coins. Three days later he issues a decree to allow the continued use of silver.
- Prince Ōtsu, son of Tenmu, starts to attend to matters of State at about this time.
- Srivijaya is founded by Sri Jayanasa in Sumatra

====== Mesoamerica ======
- K'inich Janaab' Pakal ("Pacal the Great"), ruler (ajaw) of the Maya state of Palenque (Mexico), dies after a 68-year reign. He is buried in the Temple of the Inscriptions. He is the longest-reigning monarch in the world until Louis XIV breaks that record in 1711, almost 1028 years later and remains the longest-reigning monarch in the Americas until Elizabeth II breaks that record in 2020, almost 1337 years later

==== By topic ====
====== Art ======
- Approximate date – The sarcophagus lid in the tomb of K'inich Janaab' Pakal (Shield 2), Temple of the Inscriptions, Palenque, Mexico (Maya culture) is made.

====== Religion ======
- June 28 – Pope Leo II dies at Rome 10 months after being consecrated.
- Approximate date – Seaxwulf, bishop of Mercia, founds All Saints' Church at Brixworth in England.

=== 684 ===
==== By place ====
====== Europe ======
- Ghislemar, mayor of the palace in Neustria and Burgundy, dies after a 2-year reign, and is succeeded by his father Waratto. He makes peace between the three Frankish kingdoms.

====== Britain ======
- King Ecgfrith of Northumbria sends a punitive expedition to Ireland under his ealdorman Berht, laying waste to the territory of Meath, ruled by High King Fínsnechta Fledach.

====== Arabian Empire ======
- Caliph Mu'awiya II dies at Damascus, after a brief reign that ends Sufyanid rule. A new caliph is proclaimed in Syria amidst tribal wars, but Marwan I will reign until next year.
- August 18 – Battle of Marj Rahit: Muslim partisans under Marwan I defeat the supporters of Abd Allah ibn al-Zubayr near Damascus, and cement Umayyad control of Syria.

====== Asia ======
- January 3 – Zhong Zong succeeds his father Gao Zong, and becomes emperor of the Tang dynasty. His mother Wu Zetian remains the power behind the throne in China.
- February 27 – Wu Zetian replaces Zhong Zong in favor of his younger brother Rui Zong. He becomes a puppet ruler, and Zhong Zong is placed under house arrest.
- Summer – The Pallava Empire (modern India) invades the kingdom of Ceylon. A Pallavan naval expedition employing Tamil mercenaries ends the Moriya dynasty.

====== =Japan= ======
- September 7 – A large comet is observed in Japan (it's Japan's oldest observation record of Halley's Comet).
- November 13 – Emperor Tenmu institutes eight titles of eight classes (Yakusa-no-kabane) in Japan.
- November 26 – 684 Hakuho earthquake. A great earthquake strikes Japan. The people, houses, temples, shrines and domestic animals are greatly damaged.

====== Mesoamerica ======
- February 10 – Kʼinich Kan Bahlam II accedes to the rulership of the Maya polity of Palenque (modern Mexico).

==== By topic ====
====== Religion ======
- Cuthbert is elected Bishop of Hexham, and receives a visit from a large group under Ecgfrith. He agrees to return to Lindisfarne (Northumbria) to take up duties.
- June 26 – Pope Benedict II succeeds Leo II as the 81st pope of Rome, after a period of sede vacante ("vacant seat") of 1 year.

=== 685 ===
==== By place ====
====== Byzantine Empire ======
- July 10 – Emperor Constantine IV dies of dysentery at Constantinople after a 17-year reign, and is succeeded by his 16-year-old son Justinian II.

====== Europe ======
- Kuber, brother of Asparukh of Bulgaria, defeats the Avars in Syrmia (Pannonia). He leads his followers of around 70,000 people to Macedonia (modern North Macedonia).

====== Britain ======
- May 20 – Battle of Dun Nechtain: The Picts under King Bridei III revolt against their Northumbrian overlords. Cuthbert, bishop of Lindisfarne, advises King Ecgfrith of Northumbria (Bridei's cousin) not to invade Pictland (modern Scotland). Undeterred, Ecgfrith marches his army north to engage the enemy near Dunnichen. The Picts, possibly with Scottish and Strathclyde Briton help, defeat the Saxon guard, killing Ecgfrith, who has reigned for 15 years, routing his army and forcing the Anglo-Saxons to withdraw south of the River Forth.
- King Centwine of Wessex dies after a 9-year reign and is succeeded by his distant cousin, Cædwalla, who manages to fully re-unite the sub-kingdoms of Wessex. He attacks Sussex with a large army, and kills King Æthelwealh in battle, in the South Downs (Hampshire). He is expelled by Æthelwealh's ealdormen, Berthun and Andhun, who jointly rule the South Saxons. Cædwalla invades Kent, lays it waste, and carries off an immense booty.
- Aldfrith, illegitimate half-brother of Ecgfrith, becomes (possibly with Irish and Scottish help) king of Northumbria. He is brought from Iona (Inner Hebrides), where he is studying for a career in the church.
- King Eadric revolts against his uncle Hlothhere, and defeats him in battle. He becomes sole ruler of Kent until his death in 686.

====== Arabian Empire ======
- Battle of 'Ayn al-Warda: An Umayyad army (20,000 men) under Husayn ibn Numayr defeats the pro-Alid Kufans at Ras al-'Ayn (Syria).
- May 7 – Caliph Marwan I dies at Damascus, and is succeeded by his son Abd al-Malik ibn Marwan.

Mukhtar controlled much of Iraq from October 685 until the end of 686. Region controlled by Abd al-Malik Region under the control of Mukhtar Regions under the control/influence of Ibn al-Zubayr Kharijite controlled areas

====== China ======
- Empress Wu Zetian sends a pair of giant pandas to the Japanese court of Emperor Tenmu, as a diplomatic gift (approximate date).
- Wu Zetian exiles her son Zhong Zong, former emperor of the Tang dynasty, and his family to the island of Fang Zhou.

==== By topic ====
====== Religion ======
- May 8 – Pope Benedict II dies at Rome after a reign of less than 11 months. He is succeeded by John V as the 82nd pope.
- John Maron is elected as the first patriarch in the Maronite Church (approximate date).

=== 686 ===
==== By place ====
====== Europe ======
- Waratton, mayor of the palace of Neustria and Burgundy, dies and is succeeded by his son-in-law Berchar. He advises King Theuderic III to break the peace treaty with Pepin of Herstal, and declares war on Austrasia.

====== Britain ======
- King Cædwalla of Wessex establishes overlordship of Essex, and invades Kent for a second time. King Eadric is expelled, and Cædwalla's brother Mul is installed in his place. The sub-kings Berthun and Andhun are killed, and Sussex is subjugated by the West Saxons.
- Cædwalla conquers Surrey, and tries to exterminate the Jutes of the Isle of Wight. He executes King Arwald and his two brothers. Cædwalla probably also overruns the Meonware, a Jutish people who live in the Meon Valley (Hampshire).

====== Arabian Empire ======
- August 6 – Battle of Khazir in Mosul: Alid forces of Mukhtar al-Thaqafi defeat those of the Umayyad Caliphate.
- Ubayd Allah ibn Ziyad, former governor of Mesopotamia, tries to regain control of his province, as the various Muslim tribes in the region Kufa (Iraq) are engaged in an Islamic civil war.
- Abd al-Malik ibn Marwan imprisons and tortures patriarch Mar Khnanishu I. He is the first caliph to insist on the collection of the poll tax from the Christians (approximate date).

====== Asia ======
- October 1 – Emperor Tenmu of Japan dies after a 13-year reign, and is succeeded by his widow (and niece), Empress Jitō. She will reign until 697.
- October 25 – Prince Ōtsu, son of Tenmu, is falsely accused of treason by Jito and forced to commit suicide, along with his wife Yamanobe.

==== By topic ====
====== Religion ======
- August 2 – Pope John V dies at Rome after a 12-month reign, in which he has made handsome donations to the poor. He is succeeded by Conon I as the 83rd pope of the Catholic Church.
- Plague kills almost all the Benedictine monks in the monastery of Monkwearmouth–Jarrow Abbey (Northumbria), aside from the abbot Ceolfrith and one small boy – future scholar Bede.
- Wilfrid, bishop of York, becomes an advisor of Cædwalla, and is sent to the Isle of Wight to evangelise the inhabitants.

=== 687 ===
==== By place ====
====== Byzantine Empire ======
- Emperor Justinian II negotiates a peace treaty with the Umayyad Caliphate (resulting in caliph Abd al-Malik paying tribute). He removes 12,000 Christian Maronites, who continually resist the Arabs, from Lebanon. Justinian reinforces the Byzantine navy on Cyprus, and transfers cavalry troops from the Thracesian Theme in Anatolia to the Theme of Thrace in the Balkan Peninsula.

====== Europe ======
- Battle of Tertry: King Theuderic III of Neustria is defeated by Pepin of Herstal, mayor of the palace of Austrasia, near Péronne (modern France), at the River Somme. Theuderic withdraws to Paris and is forced to sign a peace treaty. Pepin becomes "de facto" ruler of the Frankish Kingdom, and begins calling himself Duke of the Franks. He establishes a base for the future rise of the Pippinids and the Carolingians. Pepin appoints Nordebert as Duke of Burgundy, and puts him in charge of Neustria and Burgundy (as a sort of regent).
- King Erwig dies after a 7-year reign, and is succeeded by his son-in-law Ergica as ruler of the Visigothic Kingdom.

====== Britain ======
- King Mul of Kent and 12 companions are burnt to death, during a Kentish uprising. His brother, King Cædwalla of Wessex, ravages the kingdom in revenge.
- Adomnán, Irish abbot of Iona, visits the court of King Ecgfrith, to ransom Irish captives (60 Gaels who had been captured in a Northumbrian raid).

==== By topic ====
====== Religion ======
- Cuthbert, bishop of Lindisfarne, resigns his office and retires to his hermitage on Inner Farne (Northumberland) where he dies, after a painful illness.
- September 21 – Pope Conon I dies at Rome after a 1-year reign, and is succeeded by Sergius I as the 84th pope of the Catholic Church.
- Construction of the Dome of the Rock, located on the Temple Mount, is started in Jerusalem (approximate date).

=== 688 ===
==== By place ====
====== Byzantine Empire ======
- Byzantine–Bulgarian War: Emperor Justinian II carries out a Balkan campaign and marches through Thrace, where he restores Byzantine rule. He establishes a theme administration, and migrates many Bulgars and Slavs to the Opsician Theme (Asia Minor).
- Justinian II reestablishes Byzantine settlement on Cyprus, signing a treaty with Umayyad caliph Abd al-Malik (and paying an annual tribute) for joint occupation of the island.

====== Europe ======
- King Perctarit of the Lombards is assassinated by a conspiracy, after a 17-year reign. He is succeeded by his son Cunipert, who is crowned ruler of the Lombard Kingdom in Italy.
- Alahis, duke of Brescia, starts a civil war in Northern Italy. He besieges Cunipert on an island in Lake Como (Lombardy), who breaks out with Piedmontese troops.

====== Britain ======
- King Caedwalla of Wessex abdicates the throne and departs on a pilgrimage to Rome, possibly because of the wounds he suffered while fighting on the Isle of Wight. The power vacuum is filled by Ine, son of his second cousin, sub-king Coenred of Dorset.
- King Æthelred of Mercia establishes Mercian dominance over most of Southern England. He installs Oswine, minor member of the Kentish royal family (second cousin of king Eadric), as king of Kent. Prince Swæfheard of Essex is given West Kent.

==== By topic ====
====== Religion ======
- Eadberht is appointed bishop of Lindisfarne (Northumbria). He founds the holy shrine to his predecessor Cuthbert, a place that becomes a centre of great pilgrimage in later years.

=== 689 ===
==== By place ====
====== Byzantine Empire ======
- Byzantine–Bulgarian War: Emperor Justinian II defeats the Bulgars of Macedonia and recaptures Thessalonica, the second most important Byzantine city in Europe. He resettles the subdued Slavs in Anatolia (modern Turkey), where they are required to provide 30,000 men to the Byzantine army.

====== Europe ======
- Battle of Coronate: The Lombards under King Cunipert defeat the army of Duke Alahis, at the River Adda (Lombardy). He executes the rebel leaders; Alahis is captured and his head and legs are cut off. The southern Lombard duchies take advantage of Cunipert's distraction, and extend their territories.
- Battle of Dorestad: The Frisians under King Radbod are defeated by the Frankish mayor of the palace, Pippin of Herstal. The Rhine delta and Dorestad (modern Netherlands) become Frankish again, as well as the castles of Utrecht and Fechten (approximate date).

====== Asia ======
- The Asuka Kiyomihara Code, a collection of governing rules commenced in 681 under Emperor Tenmu, is promulgated in Japan.

==== By topic ====
====== Religion ======
- Cædwalla of Wessex arrives in Rome and is baptised by pope Sergius I, taking the name Peter. He dies 10 days later and is buried at St. Peter's Basilica.
- Prince Oswald, brother of King Osric of Hwicce, founds Pershore Abbey in Worcestershire (approximate date).

== Significant people ==
- Mu'awiya I caliph
- Yazid I
- Mu'awiya II
- Marwan
- Abd al-Malik
- Constans II

== Births ==
680

- Ali Asghar ibn Husayn, Son of 3rd shia Imam. Killed in Karbala (d. 680)
- Fujiwara no Muchimaro, Japanese politician (d. 737)
- Genshō, empress of Japan (d. 748)
- Oda of Scotland, Christian saint (approximate date)
- Wu Daozi, Chinese painter (d. 760)

681

- Fujiwara no Fusasaki, Japanese counselor (d. 737)
- Pei Yaoqing, chancellor of the Tang dynasty (d. 743)

682

- July 20 – Taichō, Japanese Buddhist monk (d. 767)
- November 2 – Umar II, Muslim caliph (d. 720)
- Li Chongrun, prince of the Tang dynasty (d. 701)

683

- Bilge Khan, ruler (khagan) of the Turkic Khaganate (or 684)
- Genshō, empress regnant of Japan (d. 748)
- Monmu, emperor of Japan (d. 707)
- Yi Xing, Chinese astronomer and mechanical engineer (d. 727)

684

- Gao Lishi, official and eunuch of the Tang dynasty (d. 762)
- Li Guo'er, princess of the Tang dynasty (approximate date)
- Nagaya, Japanese prince and politician (d. 729)
- Tachibana no Moroe, Japanese prince and minister (d. 757)

685

- September 8 – Xuan Zong, emperor of the Tang dynasty (d. 762)
- Kul Tigin, general and prince of the Second Turkic Khaganate (d. 731)
- Leo III, emperor of the Byzantine Empire (d. 741)
- Li Xianhui, princess of the Tang dynasty (d. 701)
- Miao Jinqing, chancellor of the Tang dynasty (d. 765)
- Pelagius, king of Asturias (approximate date)
- Theodbert, duke of Bavaria (approximate date)

687

- Eucherius, Frankish bishop (d. 743)
- Wei Jiansu, chancellor of the Tang dynasty (d. 763)
- Wittiza, king of the Visigoths (approximate date)
- Yazid II, Muslim caliph (d. 724)

688

- Charles Martel, Frankish statesman and founder of the Carolingian dynasty (d. 741)
- Jianzhen, Chinese Buddhist monk (d. 763)
- Wang Zhihuan, Chinese poet (d. 742)

689

- Othmar, Swiss abbot (approximate date)
- Rōben, Japanese Buddhist monk (d. 773)

== Deaths ==
680

- January 1 – Javanshir, king of Caucasian Albania (b. 616)
- January 30 – Balthild, queen of the Franks
- October 9 – Ghislain, Frankish anchorite and saint
- October 10
  - Abbas ibn Ali, son of Imam Ali
  - Ali al-Akbar ibn Husayn, son of Al-Husayn
  - Ali al-Asghar ibn Husayn, son of Al-Husayn
  - Habib ibn Madhahir
  - Husayn ibn Ali, third Shia Imam and grandson of Muhammad (b. 626)K
- Agatho, pope of the Coptic Orthodox Church
- Bhāskara I, Indian mathematician (approximate date)
- Cædmon, Northumbrian poet
- Ebroin, Mayor of the Palace of Neustria (or 681)
- Hilda of Whitby, Northumbrian abbess and saint
- Muawiyah I, founder of the Umayyad Caliphate (b. 602)
- Umm Salama, wife of Muhammad
- Vikramaditya I, king of Chalukya (India)
- Wulfoald, Mayor of the Palace of Austrasia

681

- January 10 – Pope Agatho
- Ebroin, Mayor of the Palace of Neustria (or 680)
- Hao Chujun, general of the Tang dynasty (b. 607)
- Jayavarman I, king of Chenla (Cambodia)
- Munmu, king of Silla (Korea)
- Queen Jaui, Korean queen consort
- Queen Munmyeong, Korean queen consort

682

- Barbatus, bishop of Benevento
- Bilal ibn al-Harith, companion of Muhammad (approximate date)
- Zaynab bint Ali, sister of Husayn ibn Ali (b. 626)
- Bojang, king of Goguryeo (Korea)
- Buyeo Yung, prince of Baekje (in exile in Luoyang)
- Cadwaladr, king of Gwynedd (Wales)
- Cenn Fáelad mac Colgan, king of Connacht (Ireland)
- Li Jingxuan, chancellor of the Tang dynasty (b. 615)
- Maslama ibn Mukhallad, companion of Muhammad
- Sun Simiao, Chinese medicine doctor
- Lady Kʼawiil Ajaw, queen regnant of the Maya city-state of Cobá (b. 617)

683

- June 28 – Leo II, pope of the Catholic Church (b. 611)
- November 11 – Yazid I, Muslim caliph (b. 647)
- December 27 – Gao Zong, emperor of the Tang dynasty (b. 628)
- Æbbe, Anglo-Saxon princess and abbess
- Anseung, king of Goguryeo (Korea)
- Cui Zhiwen, official of the Tang dynasty (b. 627)
- Dúnchad Muirisci, king of Connacht (Ireland)
- K'inich Janaab' Pakal ("Pacal the Great"), ruler (ajaw) of Palenque (b. 603)
- Sighere, king of Essex
- Waningus, Frankish abbot (approximate date)
- Xue Rengui, general of the Tang dynasty (b. 614)
- Xue Yuanchao, official of the Tang dynasty (b. 622)

684

- Adarnase II, king of Iberia (approximate date)
- Aldegund, Frankish Benedictine abbess
- Constantine of Mananali, founder of the Paulicians
- Ghislemar, mayor of the palace in Neustria and Burgundy
- Li Xian, prince of the Tang dynasty (b. 653)
- Luo Binwang, Chinese poet and official
- Mu'awiya II, Muslim caliph (b. 661)
- Pei Yan, chancellor of the Tang dynasty
- Philibert of Jumièges, Frankish abbot
- Severus II bar Masqeh, Syriac Orthodox Patriarch of Antioch.

685

- February 6 – Hlothhere, king of Kent
- May 8 – Benedict II, pope of the Catholic Church (b. 635)
- May 20 – Ecgfrith, king of Northumbria
- Æthelwealh, king of Sussex
- Anania Shirakatsi, Armenian astronomer (b. 610)
- Beornhæth, Anglo-Saxon nobleman
- Centwine, king of Wessex (approximate date)
- Constantine IV, Byzantine emperor (b. 652)
- Liu Rengui, chancellor of the Tang dynasty (b. 602)

686

- August 2 – John V, pope of Rome (b. 635)
- October 1 – Tenmu, emperor of Japan
- October 25 – Ōtsu, Japanese prince (b. 663)
- Andhun, king of Sussex
- Arwald, king of the Isle of Wight
- Audoin, bishop of Rouen (b. 609)
- Berthun, king of Sussex
- Eadric, king of Kent (approximate date)
- Eanflæd, queen of Northumbria (approximate date)
- Eata of Hexham, bishop of Lindisfarne
- Husayn ibn Numayr, Muslim general
- Landelin, Frankish abbot and saint
- Waratton, mayor of the palace of Neustria
- Wonhyo, Korean Buddhist monk (b. 617)
- Yamanobe, Japanese princess

687

- March 20 – Cuthbert, Anglo-Saxon bishop
- September 21 – Pope Conon I
- Abd Allah ibn Abbas, cousin of Muhammad
- Erwig, king of the Visigoths
- Mul, king of Kent (England)
- Romuald I
- Wamba, king of the Visigoths

688

- May 24 – Ségéne, bishop of Armagh (b. c. 610)
- Abu al-Aswad al-Du'ali, Muslim scholar (or 689)
- Máel Dúin mac Conaill, king of Dál Riata (Scotland)
- Perctarit, king of the Lombards
- Rictrude, Frankish abbess

689

- April 20 – Cædwalla, king of Wessex
- July 8 – Kilian, Irish bishop (approximate date)
- May 10 – Kusakabe, Japanese prince (b. 662)
- September 10 – Guo Zhengyi, official of the Chinese Tang dynasty
- Alahis, king (usurper) of the Lombards
- Colman, Irish missionary (approximate date)
- Grimoald II, duke of Benevento (Italy)
- John III, Coptic Orthodox pope of Alexandria
- Liu Jingxian, official of the Tang dynasty
- Totnan, Irish Franconian apostle
