= 685 =

Calendar year

685 in various calendars
- Gregorian calendar: 685; DCLXXXV
- Ab urbe condita: 1438
- Armenian calendar: 134; ԹՎ ՃԼԴ
- Assyrian calendar: 5435
- Balinese saka calendar: 606–607
- Bengali calendar: 91–92
- Berber calendar: 1635
- Buddhist calendar: 1229
- Burmese calendar: 47
- Byzantine calendar: 6193–6194
- Chinese calendar: 甲申年 (Wood Monkey); 3382 or 3175 — to — 乙酉年 (Wood Rooster); 3383 or 3176
- Coptic calendar: 401–402
- Discordian calendar: 1851
- Ethiopian calendar: 677–678
- Hebrew calendar: 4445–4446
- Hindu calendars
- Vikram Samvat: 741–742
- Shaka Samvat: 606–607
- Kali Yuga: 3785–3786
- Holocene calendar: 10685
- Iranian calendar: 63–64
- Islamic calendar: 65–66
- Japanese calendar: Hakuchi 36 (白雉３６年)
- Javanese calendar: 577–578
- Julian calendar: 685; DCLXXXV
- Korean calendar: 3018
- Minguo calendar: 1227 before ROC 民前1227年
- Nanakshahi calendar: −783
- Seleucid era: 996/997 AG
- Thai solar calendar: 1227–1228
- Tibetan calendar: ཤིང་ཕོ་སྤྲེ་ལོ་ (male Wood-Monkey); 811 or 430 or −342 — to — ཤིང་མོ་བྱ་ལོ་ (female Wood-Bird); 812 or 431 or −341

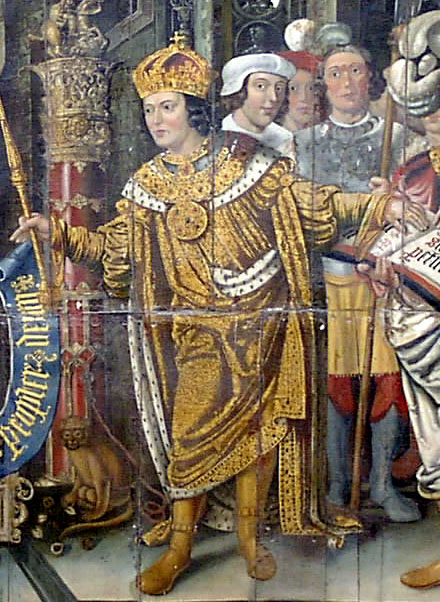
King Cædwalla of Wessex (c. 659–688)

Year 685 (DCLXXXV) was a common year starting on Sunday of the Julian calendar. The denomination 685 for this year has been used since the early medieval period, when the Anno Domini calendar era became the prevalent method in Europe for naming years.

== Events ==
=== By place ===
==== Byzantine Empire ====
- July 10 – Emperor Constantine IV dies of dysentery at Constantinople after a 17-year reign, and is succeeded by his 16-year-old son Justinian II.

==== Europe ====
- Kuber, brother of Asparukh of Bulgaria, defeats the Avars in Syrmia (Pannonia). He leads his followers of around 70,000 people to Macedonia (modern North Macedonia).

==== Britain ====
- May 20 – Battle of Dun Nechtain: The Picts under King Bridei III revolt against their Northumbrian overlords. Cuthbert, bishop of Lindisfarne, advises King Ecgfrith of Northumbria (Bridei's cousin) not to invade Pictland (modern Scotland). Undeterred, Ecgfrith marches his army north to engage the enemy near Dunnichen. The Picts, possibly with Scottish and Strathclyde Briton help, defeat the Saxon guard, killing Ecgfrith, who has reigned for 15 years, routing his army and forcing the Anglo-Saxons to withdraw south of the River Forth.
- King Centwine of Wessex dies after a 9-year reign and is succeeded by his distant cousin, Cædwalla, who manages to fully re-unite the sub-kingdoms of Wessex. He attacks Sussex with a large army, and kills King Æthelwealh in battle, in the South Downs (Hampshire). He is expelled by Æthelwealh's ealdormen, Berthun and Andhun, who jointly rule the South Saxons. Cædwalla invades Kent, lays it waste, and carries off an immense booty.
- Aldfrith, illegitimate half-brother of Ecgfrith, becomes (possibly with Irish and Scottish help) king of Northumbria. He is brought from Iona (Inner Hebrides), where he is studying for a career in the church.
- King Eadric revolts against his uncle Hlothhere, and defeats him in battle. He becomes sole ruler of Kent until his death in 686.

==== Arabian Empire ====
- Battle of 'Ayn al-Warda: An Umayyad army (20,000 men) under Husayn ibn Numayr defeats the pro-Alid Kufans at Ras al-'Ayn (Syria).
- May 7 – Caliph Marwan I dies at Damascus, and is succeeded by his son Abd al-Malik ibn Marwan.

Mukhtar controlled much of Iraq from October 685 until the end of 686. Region controlled by Abd al-Malik Region under the control of Mukhtar Regions under the control/influence of Ibn al-Zubayr Kharijite controlled areas

==== China ====
- Empress Wu Zetian sends a pair of giant pandas to the Japanese court of Emperor Tenmu, as a diplomatic gift (approximate date).
- Wu Zetian exiles her son Zhong Zong, former emperor of the Tang dynasty, and his family to the island of Fang Zhou.

=== By topic ===
==== Religion ====
- May 8 – Pope Benedict II dies at Rome after a reign of less than 11 months. He is succeeded by John V as the 82nd pope.
- John Maron is elected as the first patriarch in the Maronite Church (approximate date).

== Births ==
- September 8 – Xuan Zong, emperor of the Tang dynasty (d. 762)
- Kul Tigin, general and prince of the Second Turkic Khaganate (d. 731)
- Leo III, emperor of the Byzantine Empire (d. 741)
- Li Xianhui, princess of the Tang dynasty (d. 701)
- Miao Jinqing, chancellor of the Tang dynasty (d. 765)
- Pelagius, king of Asturias (approximate date)
- Theodbert, duke of Bavaria (approximate date)
- Wu Daozi, Chinese painter (approximate date; d. 759 or 760)

== Deaths ==
- February 6 – Hlothhere, king of Kent
- May 8 – Benedict II, pope of the Catholic Church (b. 635)
- May 20 – Ecgfrith, king of Northumbria
- July 10 – Constantine IV, Byzantine emperor (b. 652)
- Æthelwealh, king of Sussex
- Anania Shirakatsi, Armenian astronomer (b. 610)
- Beornhæth, Anglo-Saxon nobleman
- Berthun, king of Sussex (approximate date)
- Centwine, king of Wessex (approximate date)
- Liu Rengui, chancellor of the Tang dynasty (b. 602)
