= 689 =

Calendar year

689 in various calendars
- Gregorian calendar: 689; DCLXXXIX
- Ab urbe condita: 1442
- Armenian calendar: 138; ԹՎ ՃԼԸ
- Assyrian calendar: 5439
- Balinese saka calendar: 610–611
- Bengali calendar: 95–96
- Berber calendar: 1639
- Buddhist calendar: 1233
- Burmese calendar: 51
- Byzantine calendar: 6197–6198
- Chinese calendar: 戊子年 (Earth Rat); 3386 or 3179 — to — 己丑年 (Earth Ox); 3387 or 3180
- Coptic calendar: 405–406
- Discordian calendar: 1855
- Ethiopian calendar: 681–682
- Hebrew calendar: 4449–4450
- Hindu calendars
- Vikram Samvat: 745–746
- Shaka Samvat: 610–611
- Kali Yuga: 3789–3790
- Holocene calendar: 10689
- Iranian calendar: 67–68
- Islamic calendar: 69–70
- Japanese calendar: Shuchō 4 (朱鳥４年)
- Javanese calendar: 581–582
- Julian calendar: 689; DCLXXXIX
- Korean calendar: 3022
- Minguo calendar: 1223 before ROC 民前1223年
- Nanakshahi calendar: −779
- Seleucid era: 1000/1001 AG
- Thai solar calendar: 1231–1232
- Tibetan calendar: ས་ཕོ་བྱི་བ་ལོ་ (male Earth-Rat); 815 or 434 or −338 — to — ས་མོ་གླང་ལོ་ (female Earth-Ox); 816 or 435 or −337

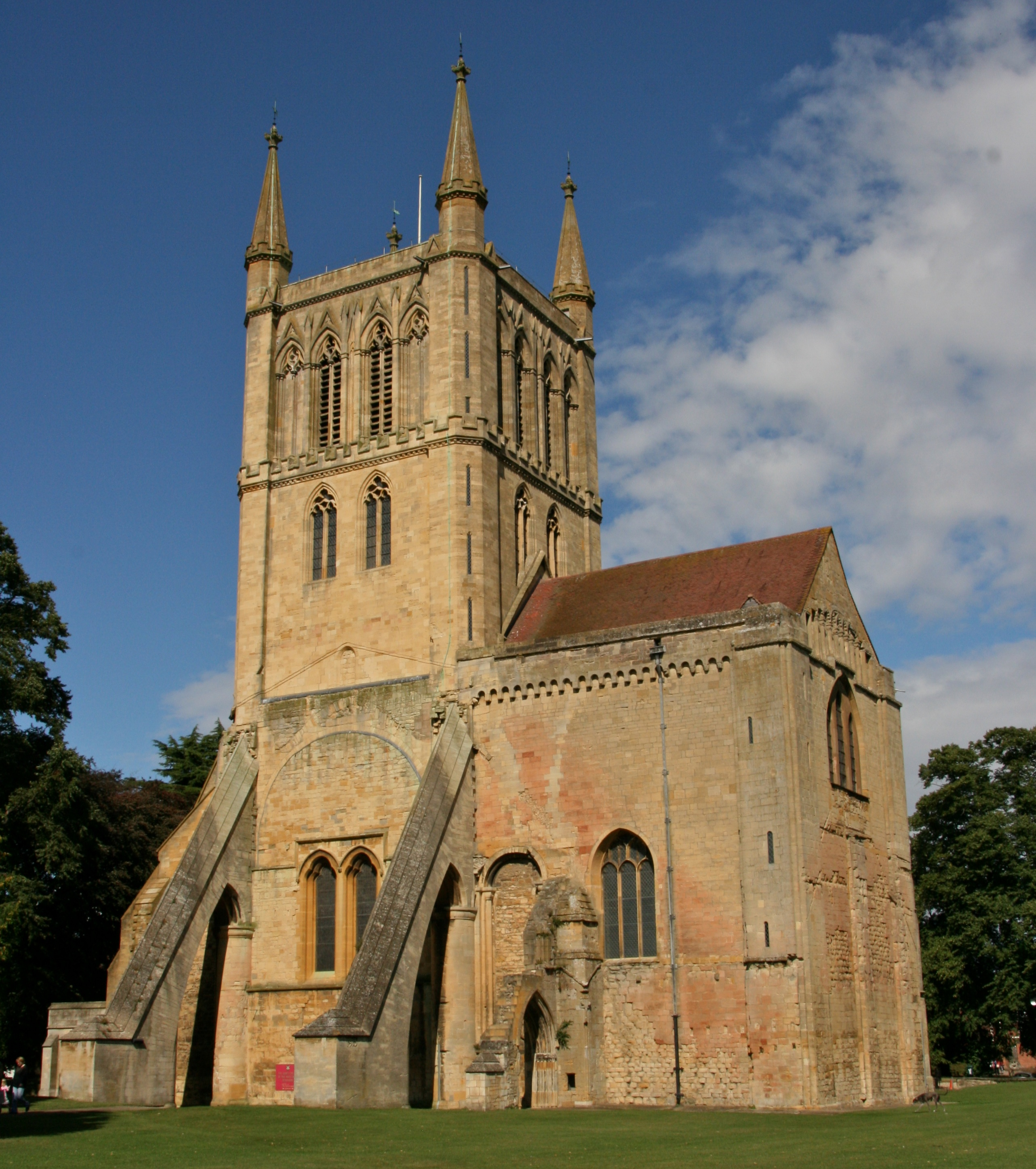
Pershore Abbey (Worcestershire)

Year 689 (DCLXXXIX) was a common year starting on Friday of the Julian calendar. The denomination 689 for this year has been used since the early medieval period, when the Anno Domini calendar era became the prevalent method in Europe for naming years.

== Events ==
=== By place ===
==== Byzantine Empire ====
- Byzantine–Bulgarian War: Emperor Justinian II defeats the Bulgars of Macedonia and recaptures Thessalonica, the second most important Byzantine city in Europe. He resettles the subdued Slavs in Anatolia (modern Turkey), where they are required to provide 30,000 men to the Byzantine army.

==== Europe ====
- Battle of Coronate: The Lombards under King Cunipert defeat the army of Duke Alahis, at the River Adda (Lombardy). He executes the rebel leaders; Alahis is captured and his head and legs are cut off. The southern Lombard duchies take advantage of Cunipert's distraction, and extend their territories.
- Battle of Dorestad: The Frisians under King Radbod are defeated by the Frankish mayor of the palace, Pippin of Herstal. The Rhine delta and Dorestad (modern Netherlands) become Frankish again, as well as the castles of Utrecht and Fechten (approximate date).

==== Asia ====
- The Asuka Kiyomihara Code, a collection of governing rules commenced in 681 under Emperor Tenmu, is promulgated in Japan.

=== By topic ===
==== Religion ====
- Cædwalla of Wessex arrives in Rome and is baptised by pope Sergius I, taking the name Peter. He dies 10 days later and is buried at St. Peter's Basilica.
- Prince Oswald, brother of King Osric of Hwicce, founds Pershore Abbey in Worcestershire (England) (approximate date).

== Births ==
- Othmar, Swiss abbot (approximate date)
- Rōben, Japanese Buddhist monk (d. 773)

== Deaths ==
- April 20 – Cædwalla, abdicated king of Wessex
- July 8 – Irish missionaries, apostles to Franconia, martyred (approximate date)
  - Kilian, bishop
  - Colman
  - Totnan
- May 10 – Kusakabe, Japanese prince (b. 662)
- September 10 – Guo Zhengyi, official of the Chinese Tang dynasty
- Alahis, king (usurper) of the Lombards
- Grimoald II, duke of Benevento (Italy)
- John III, Pope of the Coptic Orthodox Church of Alexandria
- Liu Jingxian, official of the Chinese Tang dynasty
