= 686 =

Calendar year

686 in various calendars
- Gregorian calendar: 686; DCLXXXVI
- Ab urbe condita: 1439
- Armenian calendar: 135; ԹՎ ՃԼԵ
- Assyrian calendar: 5436
- Balinese saka calendar: 607–608
- Bengali calendar: 92–93
- Berber calendar: 1636
- Buddhist calendar: 1230
- Burmese calendar: 48
- Byzantine calendar: 6194–6195
- Chinese calendar: 乙酉年 (Wood Rooster); 3383 or 3176 — to — 丙戌年 (Fire Dog); 3384 or 3177
- Coptic calendar: 402–403
- Discordian calendar: 1852
- Ethiopian calendar: 678–679
- Hebrew calendar: 4446–4447
- Hindu calendars
- Vikram Samvat: 742–743
- Shaka Samvat: 607–608
- Kali Yuga: 3786–3787
- Holocene calendar: 10686
- Iranian calendar: 64–65
- Islamic calendar: 66–67
- Japanese calendar: Hakuchi 37 / Shuchō 1 (朱鳥元年)
- Javanese calendar: 578–579
- Julian calendar: 686; DCLXXXVI
- Korean calendar: 3019
- Minguo calendar: 1226 before ROC 民前1226年
- Nanakshahi calendar: −782
- Seleucid era: 997/998 AG
- Thai solar calendar: 1228–1229
- Tibetan calendar: ཤིང་མོ་བྱ་ལོ་ (female Wood-Bird); 812 or 431 or −341 — to — མེ་ཕོ་ཁྱི་ལོ་ (male Fire-Dog); 813 or 432 or −340

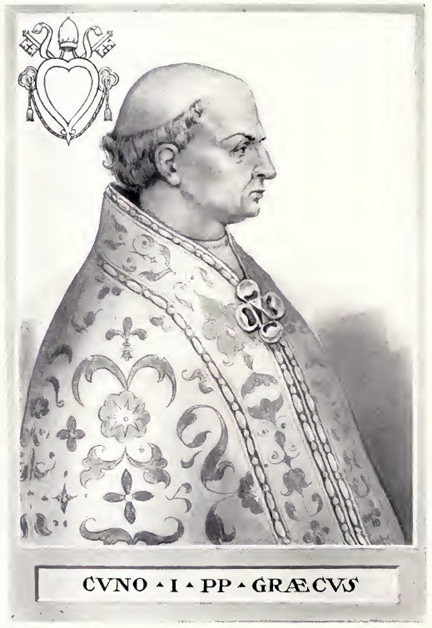
Pope Conon I (686–687)

Year 686 (DCLXXXVI) was a common year starting on Monday of the Julian calendar. The denomination 686 for this year has been used since the early medieval period, when the Anno Domini calendar era became the prevalent method in Europe for naming years.

== Events ==
=== By place ===
==== Europe ====
- Waratton, mayor of the palace of Neustria and Burgundy, dies and is succeeded by his son-in-law Berchar. He advises King Theuderic III to break the peace treaty with Pepin of Herstal, and declares war on Austrasia.

==== Britain ====
- King Cædwalla of Wessex establishes overlordship of Essex, and invades Kent for a second time. King Eadric is expelled, and Cædwalla's brother Mul is installed in his place. The sub-kings Berthun and Andhun are killed, and Sussex is subjugated by the West Saxons.
- Cædwalla conquers Surrey, and tries to exterminate the Jutes of the Isle of Wight. He executes King Arwald and his two brothers. Cædwalla probably also overruns the Meonware, a Jutish people who live in the Meon Valley (Hampshire).

==== Arabian Empire ====
- August 6 – Battle of Khazir in Mosul: Alid forces of Mukhtar al-Thaqafi defeat those of the Umayyad Caliphate.
- Ubayd Allah ibn Ziyad, former governor of Mesopotamia, tries to regain control of his province, as the various Muslim tribes in the region Kufa (Iraq) are engaged in an Islamic civil war.
- Abd al-Malik ibn Marwan imprisons and tortures patriarch Mar Khnanishu I. He is the first caliph to insist on the collection of the poll tax from the Christians (approximate date).

==== Asia ====
- October 1 – Emperor Tenmu of Japan dies after a 13-year reign, and is succeeded by his widow (and niece), Empress Jitō. She will reign until 697.
- October 25 – Prince Ōtsu, son of Tenmu, is falsely accused of treason by Jito and forced to commit suicide, along with his wife Yamanobe.

=== By topic ===
==== Religion ====
- August 2 – Pope John V dies at Rome after a 12-month reign, in which he has made handsome donations to the poor. He is succeeded by Conon I as the 83rd pope of the Catholic Church.
- Plague kills almost all of the Benedictine monks in the monastery of Monkwearmouth–Jarrow Abbey (Northumbria), aside from the abbot Ceolfrith and one small boy – future scholar Bede.
- Wilfrid, bishop of York, becomes an advisor of Cædwalla, and is sent to the Isle of Wight to evangelise the inhabitants.

== Deaths ==
- August 2 – John V, pope of Rome (b. 635)
- October 1 – Tenmu, emperor of Japan
- October 25:
  - Ōtsu, Japanese prince (b. 663)
  - Yamanobe, Japanese princess
- Andhun, king of Sussex
- Arwald, king of the Isle of Wight
- Eadric, king of Kent (approximate date)
- Eanflæd, queen of Northumbria (approximate date)
- Eata of Hexham, bishop of Lindisfarne
- Husayn ibn Numayr, Muslim general
- Landelin, Frankish abbot and saint
- Waratton, mayor of the palace of Neustria
- Wonhyo, Korean Buddhist monk (b. 617)
