= 602 =

Calendar year

602 in various calendars
- Gregorian calendar: 602; DCII
- Ab urbe condita: 1355
- Armenian calendar: 51; ԹՎ ԾԱ
- Assyrian calendar: 5352
- Balinese saka calendar: 523–524
- Bengali calendar: 8–9
- Berber calendar: 1552
- Buddhist calendar: 1146
- Burmese calendar: −36
- Byzantine calendar: 6110–6111
- Chinese calendar: 辛酉年 (Metal Rooster); 3299 or 3092 — to — 壬戌年 (Water Dog); 3300 or 3093
- Coptic calendar: 318–319
- Discordian calendar: 1768
- Ethiopian calendar: 594–595
- Hebrew calendar: 4362–4363
- Hindu calendars
- Vikram Samvat: 658–659
- Shaka Samvat: 523–524
- Kali Yuga: 3702–3703
- Holocene calendar: 10602
- Iranian calendar: 20 BP – 19 BP
- Islamic calendar: 21 BH – 20 BH
- Japanese calendar: N/A
- Javanese calendar: 491–492
- Julian calendar: 602; DCII
- Korean calendar: 2935
- Minguo calendar: 1310 before ROC 民前1310年
- Nanakshahi calendar: −866
- Seleucid era: 913/914 AG
- Thai solar calendar: 1144–1145
- Tibetan calendar: ལྕགས་མོ་བྱ་ལོ་ (female Iron-Bird); 728 or 347 or −425 — to — ཆུ་ཕོ་ཁྱི་ལོ་ (male Water-Dog); 729 or 348 or −424

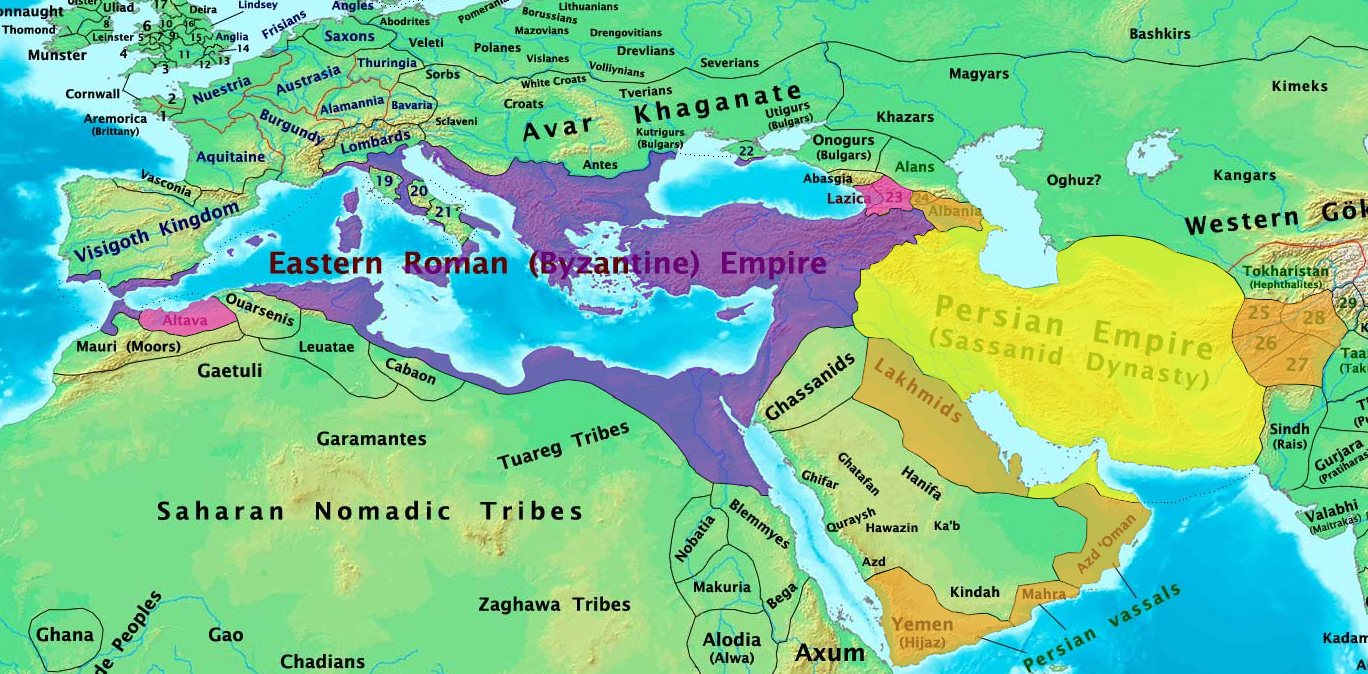
The Byzantine and Persian Empire (7th century)

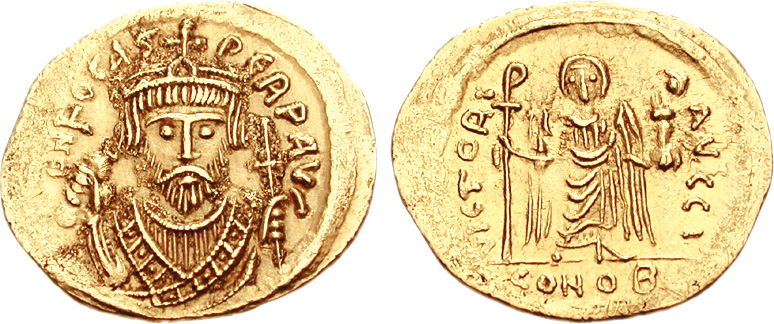
Emperor Phocas in consular robe (602–610)

Year 602 (DCII) was a common year starting on Monday of the Julian calendar. The denomination 602 for this year has been used since the early medieval period, when the Anno Domini calendar era became the prevalent method in Europe for naming years.

== Events ==
=== By place ===
==== Byzantine Empire ====
- Emperor Maurice succeeds in winning over the Avars to Byzantine rule, but his campaigns against the Avars, Lombards, Persians and Slavs drain the imperial treasury, requiring an increase in taxes. He orders the troops to stay for winter beyond the Danube, but a mutiny breaks out under Phocas. He brings the Byzantine forces back over the Danube and marches on to Constantinople.
- November 27 – A civil war breaks out and Phocas enters Constantinople. Maurice is captured trying to escape; he is forced to witness the slaughter of his five sons and all his supporters, and is then executed (beheaded) after a 20-year reign. His wife, Constantina, and his three daughters are spared, and sent to a monastery. Phocas is proclaimed the new emperor of the Byzantine Empire.
- Byzantine–Persian War: King Khosrau II launches an offensive against Constantinople, to avenge Maurice's death, his "friend and father", and tries to reconquer Byzantine territory. Narses, governor of Upper Mesopotamia, rebels against Phocas at the city of Edessa and requests aid from the Persians. Khosrau sends an expeditionary force to Armenia and crosses the Euphrates.

==== Europe ====
- Spring – Witteric is appointed commander-in-chief of the Visigoth army, and receives orders from King Liuva II to expel the Byzantines from Hispania.

==== Persia ====
- Khosrau II annexes the Lakhmid kingdom (Southern Iraq), and puts king Nu'man III to death.

==== Asia ====
- Third Chinese domination of Vietnam: The Early Lý dynasty ends; Hậu Lý Nam Đế, last ruler of Vąn Xuân (North Vietnam), abdicates the throne and becomes a vassal of the Sui dynasty.
- 602 Surb Karapet Monastery earthquake. It affected the Surb Karapet Monastery, located in the district of Taron.

=== By topic ===
==== Religion ====
- Augustine of Canterbury meets with the Welsh bishops at Aust near Chepstow. He accuses them of not adopting the Roman Christian way of dating Easter, and persuades them to accept the teaching of baptism (according to the Roman Rite).

== Births ==
- Adaloald, king of the Lombards (d. 626)
- Li Chunfeng, Chinese mathematician and historian (d. 670)
- Liu Rengui, general and official of the Tang dynasty (d. 685)
- Muawiyah I, founder of the Umayyad Caliphate (d. 680)
- Theodore of Tarsus, archbishop of Canterbury (d. 690)
- Xuanzang, Chinese Buddhist monk and traveler (d. 664)
- Zhiyan, Chinese (Buddhist) patriarch (d. 668)
- Muawiyah bin Abi-Sufyan, Caliph of Syria (d. 680)

== Deaths ==
- September 10 – Dugu Qieluo, empress of the Chinese Sui dynasty (b. 544)
- November 27 – Maurice, Byzantine emperor (b. 539)
- Nu'man III, king of the Lakhmid kingdom
- Ariulf, Lombard duke of Spoleto
- Bayan I, ruler (khagan) of the Avars
- Comentiolus, Byzantine general (magister militum)
- Peter, Byzantine general (curopalates)
- Theodosius, Byzantine co-emperor
- Tiberius, Byzantine prince
- Lady Xian, Chinese general (b. 512)

== Sources ==
- Guidoboni, Emanuela; Traina, Giusto (1995), "A new catalogue of earthquakes in the historical Armenian area from antiquity to the 12th century", Annals of Geophysics, 38 8, doi:10.4401/ag-4134
