= 539 =

Calendar year

539 in various calendars
- Gregorian calendar: 539; DXXXIX
- Ab urbe condita: 1292
- Assyrian calendar: 5289
- Balinese saka calendar: 460–461
- Bengali calendar: −55 – −54
- Berber calendar: 1489
- Buddhist calendar: 1083
- Burmese calendar: −99
- Byzantine calendar: 6047–6048
- Chinese calendar: 戊午年 (Earth Horse); 3236 or 3029 — to — 己未年 (Earth Goat); 3237 or 3030
- Coptic calendar: 255–256
- Discordian calendar: 1705
- Ethiopian calendar: 531–532
- Hebrew calendar: 4299–4300
- Hindu calendars
- Vikram Samvat: 595–596
- Shaka Samvat: 460–461
- Kali Yuga: 3639–3640
- Holocene calendar: 10539
- Iranian calendar: 83 BP – 82 BP
- Islamic calendar: 86 BH – 85 BH
- Javanese calendar: 426–427
- Julian calendar: 539; DXXXIX
- Korean calendar: 2872
- Minguo calendar: 1373 before ROC 民前1373年
- Nanakshahi calendar: −929
- Seleucid era: 850/851 AG
- Thai solar calendar: 1081–1082
- Tibetan calendar: ས་ཕོ་རྟ་ལོ་ (male Earth-Horse); 665 or 284 or −488 — to — ས་མོ་ལུག་ལོ་ (female Earth-Sheep); 666 or 285 or −487

Year 539 (DXXXIX) was a common year of the Julian calendar. At the time, it was known as the Year of the Consulship of Strategius without colleague (or, less frequently, year 1292 Ab urbe condita). The denomination 539 for this year has been used since the early medieval period, when the Anno Domini calendar era became the prevalent method in Europe for naming years.

== Events ==
=== By place ===
==== Byzantine Empire ====
- March – Gothic War: The Goths and the Burgundians recapture Mediolanum (modern Milan), after many months of siege, the city reaching the point of starvation. The Byzantine garrison (1,000 men) surrenders and is spared, but the inhabitants are massacred (according to Procopius 300,000 people are murdered), and the city itself is destroyed.
- Belisarius, still besieging Ravenna, negotiates a treaty with Theodebert I (whose forces are suffering from dysentery), and the Franks retreat to Gaul. The Byzantine fleet controls the Adriatic Sea and blockades the port of the capital from supplies.
- Emperor Justinian I becomes alarmed by renewed barbarian incursions across the Danube frontier from the Slavs, the Bulgars, the Gepids, and the Avars.
- November 29 – Antioch is struck by an earthquake.

==== Europe ====
- Walthari murders his uncle Wacho and becomes king of the Lombards.

==== Asia ====
- Kinmei succeeds his brother Senka, and ascends as 29th emperor to the throne of Japan.

=== By topic ===
==== Society ====
- Fourth year of worldwide famine, a consequence of the Extreme weather events of 535–536. (Note: Famine is described as "U539.1, Failure of bread" in the Annals of Ulster.)

== Births ==
- Abu Talib ibn Abd al-Muttalib, leader of the Banu Hashim and uncle of Muhammad (d. 619)
- Bertha, wife of Æthelberht of Kent
- Chilperic I, king of Neustria (approximate date)
- Maurice, emperor of the Byzantine Empire (d. 602)

== Deaths ==
- Senka, emperor of Japan
- Wacho, king of the Lombards
