= 662 =

Calendar year

662 in various calendars
Gregorian calendar	662; DCLXII
Ab urbe condita	1415
Armenian calendar	111; ԹՎ ՃԺԱ
Assyrian calendar	5412
Balinese saka calendar	583–584
Bengali calendar	68–69
Berber calendar	1612
Buddhist calendar	1206
Burmese calendar	24
Byzantine calendar	6170–6171
Chinese calendar	辛酉年 (Metal Rooster); 3359 or 3152 — to — 壬戌年 (Water Dog); 3360 or 3153
Coptic calendar	378–379
Discordian calendar	1828
Ethiopian calendar	654–655
Hebrew calendar	4422–4423
- Hindu calendars
Vikram Samvat	718–719
Shaka Samvat	583–584
Kali Yuga	3762–3763
Holocene calendar	10662
Iranian calendar	40–41
Islamic calendar	41–42
Japanese calendar	Hakuchi 13 (白雉１３年)
Javanese calendar	553–554
Julian calendar	662; DCLXII
Korean calendar	2995
Minguo calendar	1250 before ROC 民前1250年
Nanakshahi calendar	−806
Seleucid era	973/974 AG
Thai solar calendar	1204–1205
Tibetan calendar	ལྕགས་མོ་བྱ་ལོ་ (female Iron-Bird); 788 or 407 or −365 — to — ཆུ་ཕོ་ཁྱི་ལོ་ (male Water-Dog); 789 or 408 or −364

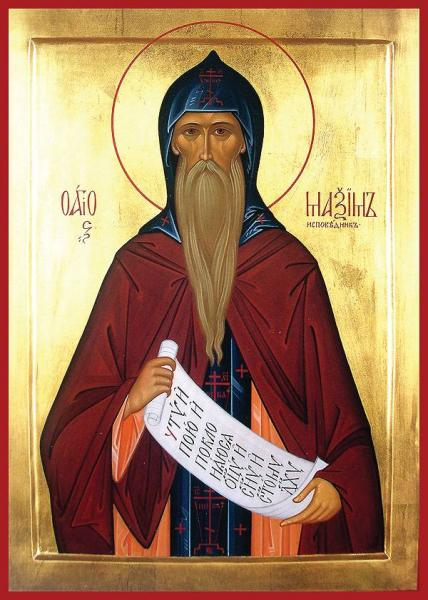
Icon of Maximus the Confessor (c. 580–662)

Year 662 (DCLXII) was a common year starting on Saturday of the Julian calendar. The denomination 662 for this year has been used since the early medieval period, when the Anno Domini calendar era became the prevalent method in Europe for naming years.

== Events ==
=== By place ===
==== Europe ====
- King Godepert makes war against his brother Perctarit. He seeks the aid of Grimoald I, duke of Benevento, who has him assassinated; his son Raginpert escapes. Grimoald usurps the throne and becomes ruler of the Lombard Kingdom. Perctarit is exiled, and seeks refuge in Gaul and Britain.
- The Franks take advantage of the Lombard civil war and invade Northern Italy, but are defeated by Grimoald I. King Chlothar III gives Austrasia to his youngest brother Childeric II. He is raised on the shield of his warriors and proclaimed king of Austrasia.

==== Britain ====
- King Swithelm of Essex is converted to Christianity and baptised by Cedd, at the court of King Æthelwald of East Anglia, who acts as his sponsor. East Anglia may have held some sort of overlordship over Essex at this time (approximate date).

==== Arab Empire ====
- Muslim Conquest: Arab forces of the Umayyad Caliphate resume the push to capture Persian lands, and begin to move towards the lands east and north of the plateau, towards Greater Khorasan (Iran) and the Silk Road along Transoxiana.
- Ziyad ibn Abi Sufyan, Muslim general and a member of the Umayyad clan, is appointed governor of Iraq (Basra) and the former Persian provinces (approximate date).

=== By topic ===
==== Religion ====
- August 13 – Maximus the Confessor, Byzantine monk and theologian, dies in exile in Lazica (modern Georgia), on the southeastern shore of the Black Sea.

== Births ==
- June 22 – Rui Zong, emperor of the Tang dynasty (d. 716)
- Ali al-Akbar ibn Husayn, Muslim martyr (d. 680)
- Kakinomoto no Hitomaro, Japanese poet (approximate date)
- Kusakabe, Japanese crown prince (d. 689)
- Odile of Alsace, Frankish abbess (approximate date)
- Rumwold of Buckingham, Anglo-Saxon prince and saint

== Deaths ==
- August 13 – Maximus the Confessor, Byzantine theologian
- Godepert, king of the Lombards
- Rumwold of Buckingham, Anglo-Saxon prince and saint
- Lai Ji, official of the Tang dynasty (b. 610)
- Qais Abdur Rashid from whom all Pashtuns descend according to local Pashto folklore
