= 680 =

Calendar year

680 in various calendars
- Gregorian calendar: 680; DCLXXX
- Ab urbe condita: 1433
- Armenian calendar: 129; ԹՎ ՃԻԹ
- Assyrian calendar: 5430
- Balinese saka calendar: 601–602
- Bengali calendar: 86–87
- Berber calendar: 1630
- Buddhist calendar: 1224
- Burmese calendar: 42
- Byzantine calendar: 6188–6189
- Chinese calendar: 己卯年 (Earth Rabbit); 3377 or 3170 — to — 庚辰年 (Metal Dragon); 3378 or 3171
- Coptic calendar: 396–397
- Discordian calendar: 1846
- Ethiopian calendar: 672–673
- Hebrew calendar: 4440–4441
- Hindu calendars
- Vikram Samvat: 736–737
- Shaka Samvat: 601–602
- Kali Yuga: 3780–3781
- Holocene calendar: 10680
- Iranian calendar: 58–59
- Islamic calendar: 60–61
- Japanese calendar: Hakuchi 31 (白雉３１年)
- Javanese calendar: 572–573
- Julian calendar: 680; DCLXXX
- Korean calendar: 3013
- Minguo calendar: 1232 before ROC 民前1232年
- Nanakshahi calendar: −788
- Seleucid era: 991/992 AG
- Thai solar calendar: 1222–1223
- Tibetan calendar: ས་མོ་ཡོས་ལོ་ (female Earth-Hare); 806 or 425 or −347 — to — ལྕགས་ཕོ་འབྲུག་ལོ་ (male Iron-Dragon); 807 or 426 or −346

Year 680 (DCLXXX) was a leap year starting on Sunday of the Julian calendar. The denomination 680 for this year has been used since the early medieval period, when the Anno Domini calendar era became the prevalent method in Europe for naming years.

== Events ==
=== By place ===
==== Byzantine Empire ====
- Byzantine–Bulgarian War: The Bulgars under Asparukh subjugate the country of current-day Bulgaria, north of the Balkan Mountains. Emperor Constantine IV leads a combined land and sea operation against the invaders and besieges their fortified camp in Dobruja.
- Battle of Ongal: The Byzantine army (25,000 men) under Constantine IV is defeated by the Bulgars and their Slavic allies in the Danube Delta. Bulgar cavalry force the Byzantines into a rout, while Constantine (suffering from leg pain) travels to Nesebar to seek treatment.

==== Europe ====
- King Wamba is deposed after an 8-year reign, and forced to retire to a monastery. He is succeeded by Erwig who becomes ruler of the Visigothic Kingdom.
- King Perctarit makes his son Cunipert co-ruler of the Lombard Kingdom. He signs a formal peace treaty with Constantine IV.
- Pippin of Herstal becomes Mayor of the Palace of Austrasia.
- The emporium (market town) of Dorestad is founded near the mouth of the Rhine, and soon becomes a major trading settlement in the North Sea region (approximate date).

==== Britain ====
- King Cædwalla of Wessex becomes overly ambitious in a power-struggle with his rival, King Centwine, for Wessex overlordship. He is banished into the forests of Chiltern and Andred.

==== Arabian Empire ====
- Yazid I, son of Muawiyah I, becomes the sixth caliph (second Umayyad caliph) but Kufans in Mesopotamia rebel and invite Hussein ibn Ali (grandson of Muhammad) to take the throne.
- October 10 – Battle of Karbala: Forces under Yazid I kill Hussein ibn Ali and his closest supporters. This event leads to the civil war known as the Second Fitna.

==== Asia ====
- In Japan, Princess Uno Sarara is unwell, and Emperor Tenmu begins the erection of the Temple of Yakushi-ji (Nara Prefecture). He makes 100 people enter religion as priests, wishing her to recover her health.

=== By topic ===
==== Religion ====
- September 17 – Theodore of Tarsus, archbishop of Canterbury, convenes a synod at Hatfield that clears the English Church from any association with the heresy of monothelitism.
- November 7 – The Third Council of Constantinople (Sixth Ecumenical Council) opens in Constantinople to settle the theological controversies of monoenergism and monothelitism, ending September 16, 681.
- Wilfrid returns to Northumbria, with papal support, but is imprisoned by King Ecgfrith, and again exiled. He travels to the Kingdom of Sussex and begins to evangelise the people.
- King Merewalh of Magonsæte founds the monastery of Wenlock Priory in Shropshire, England, appointing his daughter Milburga as Benedictine abbess.
- Approximate date
  - Boniface begins his education at an English Celtic Christian monastery, probably in Exeter near his birthplace and one of many monasteriola built by local landowners and churchmen.
  - The Book of Durrow is created, probably in Northumbria or on the island of Iona in the Scottish Inner Hebrides.

== Births ==
- Fujiwara no Muchimaro, Japanese politician (d. 737)
- Genshō, empress of Japan (d. 748)
- Oda of Scotland, Christian saint (approximate date)
- Umar II, Muslim caliph (d. 720)

== Deaths ==
- January 30 – Balthild, queen of the Franks
- October 9 – Ghislain, Frankish anchorite and saint
- October 10
  - Abbas ibn Ali, son of Imam Ali
  - Ali al-Akbar ibn Husayn, son of Al-Husayn
  - Ali al-Asghar ibn Husayn, son of Al-Husayn
  - Habib ibn Madhahir
  - Husayn ibn Ali, third Shia Imam and grandson of Muhammad (b. 626)K
- Agatho, pope of the Coptic Orthodox Church
- Bhāskara I, Indian mathematician (approximate date)
- Ebroin, Mayor of the Palace of Neustria (or 681)
- Hilda of Whitby, Northumbrian abbess and saint
- Muawiyah I, founder of the Umayyad Caliphate (b. 602)
- Reineldis, Frankish saint (approximate date; b. ca. 630)
- Umm Salama, wife of Muhammad
- Vikramaditya I, king of Chalukya (India)
- Wulfoald, Mayor of the Palace of Austrasia

== Sources ==
- Curtin, D.P. (2025). Council of Hatfield: 680 AD. Dalcassian. ISBN 979-8-348-25896-2.
- Bury, John Bagnall (1889). A History of the Later Roman Empire from Arcadius to Irene. Vol. II. London: Macmillan.
- Collier, Jeremy; Barham, Francis Foster (1840). An Ecclesiastical History of Great Britain. Vol. 1. London: William Straker.
- Gordon, Matthew (2005). The Rise of Islam. Greenwood Press. ISBN 978-0-313-32522-9.
- Hodges, Richard (1984). "Frisians and Franks: Argonauts of the Dark Ages". Archaeology. 37 (1): 26–31. ISSN 0003-8113. JSTOR 41728801.
- Kirby, D. P. (1992). The Earliest English Kings. London: Routledge. ISBN 0-415-09086-5.
- Schieffer, Theodor (1972) [1954]. Winfrid-Bonifatius und die christliche Grundlegung Europas (in German). Wissenschaftliche Buchgesellschaft. ISBN 3-534-06065-2.
