= 602 Surb Karapet Monastery earthquake =

7th-century Armenian earthquake

Coordinates: 38.961°N 41.192°E

The 602 Surb Karapet Monastery earthquake took place in 602 (or 603) and affected the Surb Karapet Monastery, located in the district of Taron.

The primary source for this earthquake is the chronicle of pseudo-John Mamikonean (7th century). According to the pseudonymous narrative, the Surb Karapet Monastery of Innaknean "collapsed in ruins" due to the earthquake, along with the houses located below it. The narrative claims that the monastery's foundations were standing in the earthquake's area. The earthquake caused a shift in the foundations, resulting in the monastery's collapse.

The Surb Karapet Monastery (Karapeti vank') was also known as the "convent of the nine springs" (Innakneani vank'). It was located on Mount Bazmasar, which has an altitude of 2,150 m (7,050 ft). The mountain is located to the northwest of the modern city of Muş.

The monastery served as the religious centre for Taron, and it was a pilgrimage site for Armenians. In the present era, the monastery stands in ruins. It had been reconstructed on several occasions, and its architectural history is known in detail only from the 15th century onwards. Among the still extant buildings, the oldest date to the 7th or 8th century. The earthquake probably destroyed an early incarnation of the monastery.

Pseudo-John Mamikonean dates the earthquake to the first regnal year of the Byzantine emperor Phocas (reigned 602-610). The geologist Otto Wilhelm Hermann von Abich (19th century) mentions two different earthquakes in the area of the monastery, one dated to 593 and the other to 606. Abich's primary source for both events was the chronicle of Samuel Anetsi (12th century).

The historian Michael the Syrian (12th century) vaguely mentions one or more earthquakes affecting the eastern areas of the Byzantine Empire during this period. While modern historians have suggested that Michael was referring to the 602 earthquake, he might have instead misdated events of the 632 Armenia earthquake.

== Sources ==
- Guidoboni, Emanuela; Traina, Giusto (1995), A new catalogue of earthquakes in the historical Armenian area from antiquity to the 12th century, Annals of Geophysics
