= AD 747 =

Calendar year

747 in various calendars
- Gregorian calendar: 747; DCCXLVII
- Ab urbe condita: 1500
- Armenian calendar: 196; ԹՎ ՃՂԶ
- Assyrian calendar: 5497
- Balinese saka calendar: 668–669
- Bengali calendar: 153–154
- Berber calendar: 1697
- Buddhist calendar: 1291
- Burmese calendar: 109
- Byzantine calendar: 6255–6256
- Chinese calendar: 丙戌年 (Fire Dog); 3444 or 3237 — to — 丁亥年 (Fire Pig); 3445 or 3238
- Coptic calendar: 463–464
- Discordian calendar: 1913
- Ethiopian calendar: 739–740
- Hebrew calendar: 4507–4508
- Hindu calendars
- Vikram Samvat: 803–804
- Shaka Samvat: 668–669
- Kali Yuga: 3847–3848
- Holocene calendar: 10747
- Iranian calendar: 125–126
- Islamic calendar: 129–130
- Japanese calendar: Tenpyō 19 (天平１９年)
- Javanese calendar: 641–642
- Julian calendar: 747; DCCXLVII
- Korean calendar: 3080
- Minguo calendar: 1165 before ROC 民前1165年
- Nanakshahi calendar: −721
- Seleucid era: 1058/1059 AG
- Thai solar calendar: 1289–1290
- Tibetan calendar: མེ་ཕོ་ཁྱི་ལོ་ (male Fire-Dog); 873 or 492 or −280 — to — མེ་མོ་ཕག་ལོ་ (female Fire-Boar); 874 or 493 or −279

Year 747 (DCCXLVII) was a common year starting on Sunday of the Julian calendar. The denomination 747 for this year has been used since the early medieval period, when the Anno Domini calendar era became the prevalent method in Europe for naming years.

== Events ==
=== By place ===
==== Byzantine Empire ====
- Arab–Byzantine War: Emperor Constantine V destroys the Arab fleet off Cyprus, with the aid of ships from the Italian city-states, breaking the naval power of the Umayyad Caliphate.

==== Europe ====
- August 15 – Carloman, mayor of the palace of Austrasia, renounces his position as majordomo, and withdraws from public life. He retires to a monastery near Rome, being tonsured by Pope Zachary, and leaves his brother Pepin the Short as sole ruler (de facto) of the Frankish Kingdom.
- Bubonic plague breaks out in Sicily, Calabria (Southern Italy), and Monemvasia (modern Greece).

==== Islamic Empire ====
- June 9 – Abbasid Revolution: Abu Muslim Khorasani, Persian military leader from Khorasan, begins an open revolt against Umayyad rule, which is carried out under the sign of the Black Standard. Close to 10,000 Muslims, primarily Khorasani Persians are under his command, when the hostilities officially begin in Merv (modern Turkmenistan).

==== Asia ====
- Chinese forces under Gao Xianzhi (a Korean in Tang employ) defeat the Arabs and Tibetans, by rapid military expeditions over the Pamir Mountains and Hindu Kush. About 72 local Indian and Sogdian kingdoms become Tang vassals. Over the next two years he establishes complete control in East Asia.
- Emperor Xuan Zong abolishes the death penalty in China, during the Tang dynasty (approximate date).
- Empress Kōmyō founds the Shin-Yakushi-ji Buddhist temple in Nara (Japan).

== Births ==
- Benedict of Aniane, Frankish monk (approximate date)
- Charlemagne, king and emperor of the Franks (or 748)

== Deaths ==
- May 16 – Petronax, Italian monk and abbot (b. 675)
- August 13 – Wigbert, Anglo-Saxon monk
- October 26 – Witta of Büraburg, Anglo-Saxon missionary

Date Unknown

- Cú Chuimne, Irish monk
- Dunn, bishop of Rochester
- Fiachna ua Maicniadh, Irish abbot
- Li Shizhi, chancellor and poet of the Tang dynasty
- Sulayman ibn Hisham, Arab general
