= Cadwallon =

Cadwallon is a Welsh name derived from the Common Brittonic *Katuwellaunos (Proto-Celtic *Katu-welnā-mnos) "The One Who (-mnos) Leads (welnā-) in Battle (katu-)". The same name belonged to the Catuvellauni who lived in what is now Hertfordshire, one of the most powerful British polities in the Late Iron Age who led the resistance against the Romans in 43 CE and possibly against Caesar in 55 and 54 BCE as well.

Cadwallon is not to be confused with Caswallon, which derives from *Kađđi-welnā-mnos (the same name as Cassivellaunus), meaning "The Passionate Leader". Note that in Cornish, both Katuwellaunos(/Catuvellaunus) and Kađđiwellaunos(/Cassivellaunus) give the form Kaswallon, which adds to the confusion.

Cadwallon may refer to:

- Cadwallon Lawhir ap Einion (reigned early 6th century), King of Gwynedd
- Cadwallon ap Cadfan (reigned early 7th century), King of Gwynedd
- Cadwallon ab Owain (died c. 961), prince of Deheubarth
- Cadwallon ab Ieuaf (died 986), King of Gwynedd
- Cadwallon ap Gruffydd (c. 1100–1172), Welsh prince, son of Gruffudd ap Cynan, King of Gwynedd
- Cadwallon ap Madog (died c. 1179), ruler of Maelienydd

== See also ==
- Cædwalla (c. 65 –689), King of Wessex (Cædwalla is the Old English spelling of Cadwalla (< Brythonic *Katuwallios), an alternative form of the same name)
- Cathal
