= 681 =

Calendar year

681 in various calendars
- Gregorian calendar: 681; DCLXXXI
- Ab urbe condita: 1434
- Armenian calendar: 130; ԹՎ ՃԼ
- Assyrian calendar: 5431
- Balinese saka calendar: 602–603
- Bengali calendar: 87–88
- Berber calendar: 1631
- Buddhist calendar: 1225
- Burmese calendar: 43
- Byzantine calendar: 6189–6190
- Chinese calendar: 庚辰年 (Metal Dragon); 3378 or 3171 — to — 辛巳年 (Metal Snake); 3379 or 3172
- Coptic calendar: 397–398
- Discordian calendar: 1847
- Ethiopian calendar: 673–674
- Hebrew calendar: 4441–4442
- Hindu calendars
- Vikram Samvat: 737–738
- Shaka Samvat: 602–603
- Kali Yuga: 3781–3782
- Holocene calendar: 10681
- Iranian calendar: 59–60
- Islamic calendar: 61–62
- Japanese calendar: Hakuchi 32 (白雉３２年)
- Javanese calendar: 573–574
- Julian calendar: 681; DCLXXXI
- Korean calendar: 3014
- Minguo calendar: 1231 before ROC 民前1231年
- Nanakshahi calendar: −787
- Seleucid era: 992/993 AG
- Thai solar calendar: 1223–1224
- Tibetan calendar: ལྕགས་ཕོ་འབྲུག་ལོ་ (male Iron-Dragon); 807 or 426 or −346 — to — ལྕགས་མོ་སྦྲུལ་ལོ་ (female Iron-Snake); 808 or 427 or −345

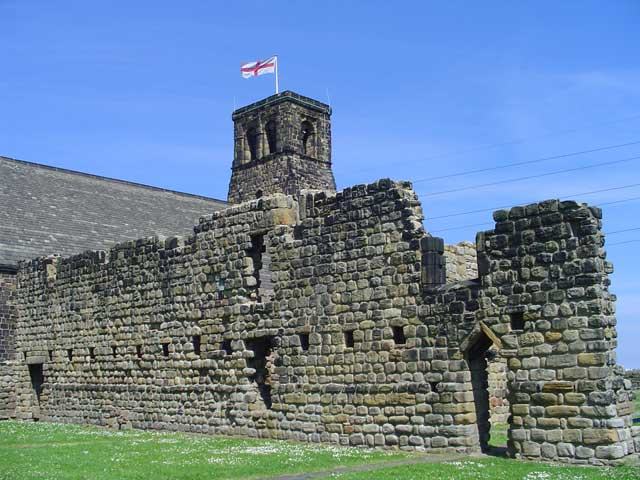
Remains of Monkwearmouth–Jarrow Abbey

Year 681 (DCLXXXI) was a common year starting on Tuesday of the Julian calendar. The denomination 681 for this year has been used since the early medieval period, when the Anno Domini calendar era became the prevalent method in Europe for naming years.

== Events ==
=== By place ===
==== Byzantine Empire ====
- Byzantine–Bulgarian War: Emperor Constantine IV is forced to acknowledge the Bulgar state in Moesia, and to pay protection money to avoid further inroads into Byzantine Thrace. Consequently, Constantine creates the Theme of Thrace of the Byzantine Empire (located in the south-eastern Balkans).
- Autumn – A military revolt breaks out in the Anatolic Theme (modern Turkey). The Byzantine army marches to Chrysopolis, and sends a delegation across the straits of the Hellespont to Constantinople, demanding that the two brothers should remain co-emperors alongside Constantine IV.
- September/November – Constantine IV has his brothers Heraclius and Tiberius mutilated, so they will be unable to rule. He orders that their images no longer appear on any coinage, and that their names be removed from official documentation.
- Constantine IV agrees to a compromise, and persuades the army to return to their barracks in Anatolia. He invites the leaders of the rebellion to come to Constantinople and consult the Senate as to how to implement the terms. On their arrival, he arrests the leaders and has them hung at Sycae.

==== Europe ====
- January 9 – Twelfth Council of Toledo: King Erwig of the Visigoths initiates a council, in which he implements diverse measures against the Jews. Laws against violence to slaves are suppressed.

==== Britain ====
- King Æthelwalh of Sussex gives Wilfrid, exiled bishop of York, lands in Selsey to found a cathedral, named Selsey Abbey.
- King Ecgfrith of Northumbria requests that the monks of Monkwearmouth found a new monastery at Jarrow (or 682).

==== Arabian Empire ====
- A Muslim Arab army led by Uqba ibn Nafi reaches Morocco, before being forced back into Cyrene by the Berbers.

==== Asia ====
- In Japan the Asuka Kiyomihara Code is commenced under Emperor Tenmu.
- Kutluk Khan revolts and establishes the Second Turkic Khaganate.
- Kusakabe, second son of Tenmu, is made crown prince.
- Sinmun becomes king of the Korean kingdom of Silla.

=== By topic ===
==== Religion ====
- January 10 – Pope Agatho dies at Rome of plague after a 2½-year reign, in which he has persuaded Constantine IV to abolish the tax heretofore levied at the consecration of a newly elected pope.
- September 16 – The Sixth Ecumenical Council (see 680) ends at Constantinople. The council reaffirms the Orthodox doctrines of the Council of Chalcedon in 451, and condemns monothelitism.

== Births ==
- Fujiwara no Fusasaki, Japanese counselor (d. 737)
- Pei Yaoqing, chancellor of the Tang dynasty (d. 743)

== Deaths ==
- January 10 – Pope Agatho
- Ebroin, Mayor of the Palace of Neustria (or 680)
- Hao Chujun, general of the Tang dynasty (b. 607)
- Jayavarman I, king of Chenla (Cambodia)
- Munmu, king of Silla (Korea)
- Queen Jaui, Korean queen consort
- Queen Munmyeong, Korean queen consort
