= Bilal ibn al-Harith =

Bilāl ibn al-Ḥārith (Arabic: بلال بن الحارث) (died ca. 682) was a sahaba. His full name was Bilal ibn al-Harith ibn 'Asim ibn Sa'id ibn Qurrah ibn Khaladah ibn Tha'labah Abu 'Abd ar-Rahman al-Mazani.

== Life ==
He came to Muhammad in the deputation from Muzaynah in 627, and carried the banner for Muzaynah on the day of the Muslim Conquest of Mecca in 630. About Ibn al-Harith it is narrated in the book of hadith, Sunan Abi Da'ud, Book 19:

[Muhammad] assigned as a fief to Bilal ibn Harith al-Muzani the mines of al-Qabaliyyah, on both the upper and lower side. The narrator, Ibn an-Nadr, added: "also Jars and Dhat an-Nusub." The agreed version reads: "and (the land) which is suitable for cultivation at Quds". He did not assign to Bilal ibn al-Harith the right of any Muslim. [Muhammad] wrote a document to him:

"This is what the [Muhammad] assigned to Bilal ibn al-Harith al-Muzani. He gave him the mines of al-Qabaliyyah both those which lay on the upper and lower side, and that which is fit for cultivation at Quds. He did not give him the right of any Muslim."

He later lived in Basra (modern day Iraq), and died in 682 in the last days of the reign of the caliph Muawiyah I.

== See also ==
- Sahaba
