= 632 Armenia earthquake =

7th-century Armenia earthquake

Coordinates: 39.280°N 43.372°E

The 632 Armenia earthquake reportedly affected the region of Armenia (Armenian highlands). The primary source for this earthquake is the chronicle of Michael the Syrian (12th century), which only offers a brief narrative on the subject. According to it, a "tremor" (earthquake) destroyed many places in Armenia. It does not specifically name these places. Michael the Syrian dates this earthquake to 632, but the exact date is unknown. The chronology of Michael's narrative is considered unreliable, and it is possible that he misdated this earthquake.

== Sources ==
- Guidoboni, Emanuela; Traina, Giusto (1995), A new catalogue of earthquakes in the historical Armenian area from antiquity to the 12th century, Annals of Geophysics
