= 626 =

Calendar year

626 in various calendars
- Gregorian calendar: 626; DCXXVI
- Ab urbe condita: 1379
- Armenian calendar: 75; ԹՎ ՀԵ
- Assyrian calendar: 5376
- Balinese saka calendar: 547–548
- Bengali calendar: 32–33
- Berber calendar: 1576
- Buddhist calendar: 1170
- Burmese calendar: −12
- Byzantine calendar: 6134–6135
- Chinese calendar: 乙酉年 (Wood Rooster); 3323 or 3116 — to — 丙戌年 (Fire Dog); 3324 or 3117
- Coptic calendar: 342–343
- Discordian calendar: 1792
- Ethiopian calendar: 618–619
- Hebrew calendar: 4386–4387
- Hindu calendars
- Vikram Samvat: 682–683
- Shaka Samvat: 547–548
- Kali Yuga: 3726–3727
- Holocene calendar: 10626
- Iranian calendar: 4–5
- Islamic calendar: 4–5
- Japanese calendar: N/A
- Javanese calendar: 516–517
- Julian calendar: 626; DCXXVI
- Korean calendar: 2959
- Minguo calendar: 1286 before ROC 民前1286年
- Nanakshahi calendar: −842
- Seleucid era: 937/938 AG
- Thai solar calendar: 1168–1169
- Tibetan calendar: ཤིང་མོ་བྱ་ལོ་ (female Wood-Bird); 752 or 371 or −401 — to — མེ་ཕོ་ཁྱི་ལོ་ (male Fire-Dog); 753 or 372 or −400

Emperor Tai Zong of the Tang dynasty

Year 626 (DCXXVI) was a common year starting on Wednesday of the Julian calendar. The denomination 626 for this year has been used since the early medieval period, when the Anno Domini calendar era became the prevalent method in Europe for naming years.

== Events ==
=== By place ===
==== Byzantine Empire ====
- Siege of Constantinople: A horde of Avars, consisting of about 80,000 men (including large contingents of Slavs, Bulgars, and other "barbarians"), attack the walls of Constantinople. A small Persian army arrives on the Bosphorus, on the Asiatic side. The Theodosian Walls are stormed with the most up-to-date siege equipment, in the form of traction trebuchets. The Avars also have mobile armoured shelters (medieval 'sows') and siege towers; the latter are covered in hides for fire protection. The defense of the capital (12,000 well-trained Byzantine troops) is in the hands of Patriarch Sergius I and Bonus (magister militum).
- July 31 – The Avars and Persian allies under Shahrbaraz launch an attack along the entire length of the Theodosian Walls (about 5.7 kilometres); the main effort is concentrated against the central section, particularly the low-lying mesoteichion. After a fierce infantry battle on the walls, the Byzantine army holds off many assaults on the city. Emperor Heraclius makes arrangements for a new army under his brother Theodore to operate against the Persians in western Anatolia, while he returns to his own army in Pontus.
- August 7 – In the waters of the Golden Horn, the Persian fleet is destroyed while ferrying reinforcements. The Avars, having suffered terrible losses, running short of food and supplies, burn their siege engines. They abandon the siege and retreat to the Balkan Peninsula. The Byzantines achieve a decisive victory at Blachernae, under the protection of the Church of the Virgin Mary.
- Byzantine–Persian War: Heraclius, his army reduced by campaigning to less than 30,000 men, is on the defensive in Pontus. Apparently he leaves a strong Byzantine garrison in Trapezus, and withdraws north-eastward along the Black Sea into Colchis, where he halts the Persians by aggressive defensive-offensive operations along the Phasis River. By attracting the Persian army under Shahin Vahmanzadegan in Anatolia, he provides Theodore with the opportunity to defeat them. By the end of the summer he threatens the communication of the Persians at Chalcedon (modern Turkey).
- Heraclius invites the Croats, a Slavic tribe living in Galicia, Silesia, and Bohemia, to settle in Illyricum. They are given the land between the Drava River and the Adriatic Sea for ridding of Avars. The Serbs are allowed to move from their homeland north of the Carpathians to a territory east of the Croats. Heraclius asks Pope Honorius I to send missionaries to both groups.
- Winter – Heraclius makes an alliance with Tong Yabghu Qaghan, ruler (khagan) of the Western Turkic Khaganate, for a joint invasion of the Persian Empire the following spring. He promises his daughter Eudoxia Epiphania, age 15, in marriage to Tong Yabghu and sends her under escort with wondrous gifts.

==== Europe ====
- Arioald succeeds his brother-in-law Adaloald as king of the Lombards, and afterwards goes insane. Arioald has his wife locked up in a monastery, accusing her of plotting against him with Grasulf II, duke of Friuli (northern Italy).

==== Britain ====
- King Edwin of Northumbria defeats the West Saxons under Cynegils, who has tried to thwart the growing strength of Edwin by having him assassinated. Edwin obliges Cynegils to acknowledge Northumbria's supremacy.
- April 19 – Eanflæd, daughter of Edwin of Northumbria, is born at a royal residence by the River Derwent. She is baptised by Paulinus, bishop of York.
- Edwin of Northumbria invades the Isle of Man and then Anglesey. King Cadwallon is defeated in battle, and is besieged on Puffin Island.
- Edinburgh (Scotland) is founded by Edwin of Northumbria (approximate date).
- Penda becomes king of Mercia (approximate date).

==== Persia ====
- Summer – King Khosrau II plans an all-out effort against Constantinople. He returns to Anatolia with two armies of unknown size, presumably more than 50,000 men each. One of these (possibly commanded by Khosrau himself) is to contain Heraclius in Pontus; another under Shahin Vahmanzadegan is defeated by Theodore.

==== Asia ====
- July 2 – Li Shimin travels to the Tang capital Chang'an to bid farewell to his younger brother Li Yuanji, who has been given command of a Chinese expedition against the Eastern Turkic Khaganate. Hearing of a plot to murder him, he and a few supporters seize the northern entrance to the emperor's palace. Li Shimin ambushes and eliminates his rival brothers Li Yuanji and Li Jiancheng, in the Xuanwu Gate Incident.
- September 4 – Emperor Gao Zu abdicates in favor of his son Li Shimin after an 8-year reign. He passes the throne to him (as Emperor Tai Zong).

==== Religion ====
- Muhammad issues a final proclamation against alcohol. Alcohol is subsequently prohibited in Islam, and his followers pour their wine into the streets.

== Births ==
- April 19 – Eanflæd, queen of Northumbria
- Balthild, queen of the Franks (approximate date)
- Heraklonas, Byzantine emperor (d. 641)
- Husayn ibn Ali, grandson of Muhammad and the third Shi'a Imam (d. 680)
- Munmu, king of Silla (d. 681)
- Tenji, emperor of Japan (d. 672)
- Zaynab bint Ali, granddaughter of Muhammad and member of Ahl al-Bayt
- Abdallah ibn Amir

== Deaths ==
- June 19 – Soga no Umako, leader of the Soga clan
- July 2 – Li Jiancheng, prince of the Tang dynasty (b. 589)
- July 2 – Li Yuanji, prince of the Tang dynasty (b. 603)
- Adaloald, king of the Lombards (approximate date)
- Cearl, king of Mercia (approximate date)
- Fatimah bint Asad, mother of Ali ibn Abi Talib (b. 555)
- Fiachnae mac Báetáin, king of Dál nAraidi (Ireland)
- Gaugericus, bishop of Cambrai (approximate date)
- Sexred, king of Essex (approximate date)
- Shahin Vahmanzadegan, Persian general (approximate date)
- Warnachar II, Mayor of the Palace (approximate date)
