= 610 =

Calendar year

610 in various calendars
- Gregorian calendar: 610; DCX
- Ab urbe condita: 1363
- Armenian calendar: 59; ԹՎ ԾԹ
- Assyrian calendar: 5360
- Balinese saka calendar: 531–532
- Bengali calendar: 16–17
- Berber calendar: 1560
- Buddhist calendar: 1154
- Burmese calendar: −28
- Byzantine calendar: 6118–6119
- Chinese calendar: 己巳年 (Earth Snake); 3307 or 3100 — to — 庚午年 (Metal Horse); 3308 or 3101
- Coptic calendar: 326–327
- Discordian calendar: 1776
- Ethiopian calendar: 602–603
- Hebrew calendar: 4370–4371
- Hindu calendars
- Vikram Samvat: 666–667
- Shaka Samvat: 531–532
- Kali Yuga: 3710–3711
- Holocene calendar: 10610
- Iranian calendar: 12 BP – 11 BP
- Islamic calendar: 12 BH – 11 BH
- Japanese calendar: N/A
- Javanese calendar: 499–501
- Julian calendar: 610; DCX
- Korean calendar: 2943
- Minguo calendar: 1302 before ROC 民前1302年
- Nanakshahi calendar: −858
- Seleucid era: 921/922 AG
- Thai solar calendar: 1152–1153
- Tibetan calendar: ས་མོ་སྦྲུལ་ལོ་ (female Earth-Snake); 736 or 355 or −417 — to — ལྕགས་ཕོ་རྟ་ལོ་ (male Iron-Horse); 737 or 356 or −416

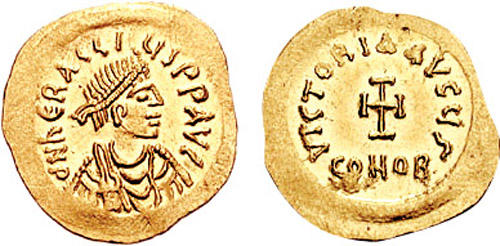
Emperor Heraclius (610–641)

Year 610 (DCX) was a common year starting on Thursday of the Julian calendar, the 610th year of the Common Era (CE) and Anno Domini (AD) designations, the 610th year of the 1st millennium, the 10th year of the 7th century, and the 1st year of the 610s decade. The denomination 610 for this year has been used since the early medieval period, when the Anno Domini calendar era became the prevalent method in Europe for naming years.

== Events ==
=== By place ===
==== Byzantine Empire ====
- October 3 – Heraclian revolt: Heraclius arrives with a fleet from Africa at Constantinople. Assisted by an uprising in the capital, he overthrows and personally beheads Emperor Phocas. Heraclius gains the throne with help from his father Heraclius the Elder. His first major act is to change the official language of the Byzantine Empire from Latin to Greek (already the language of the vast majority of the population).

==== Europe ====
- The Avars invade the Duchy of Friuli, an important buffer between the Kingdom of the Lombards in Italy and the Slavs. During the fighting Gisulf II dies and his duchy is overrun (approximate date).
- King Witteric is assassinated during a banquet at Toledo, by a faction of Catholic nobles. He is succeeded by Gundemar, duke of Narbonne, who becomes king of the Visigoths in Hispania.
- King Theuderic II loses Alsace, Champagne and Thurgau to his elder brother Theudebert II of Austrasia. His Burgundian army is defeated east of the Jura Mountains against the Alemanni.
- The Volga Bulgaria arises on the territory of modern Russia, being the first civilization in the region to arise from the Early Slavs (approximate date).

==== Britain ====
- Selyf ap Cynan succeeds his father Cynan Garwyn as king of Powys (Wales).

=== By topic ===
==== Arts and sciences ====
- Paper technology is imported into Japan from China by the Korean Buddhist priest, Dam Jing (approximate date).

==== Religion ====
- Muhammad, Islamic prophet, begins at 40 years old to preach a religion which will be called Islam. According to Islamic teachings, the angel Gabriel appears to him in a cave on Mount Hira near Mecca (Saudi Arabia) and calls him: "The Prophet of Allah". Muhammad gathers followers, reciting to them the first verses of Qur'an(Iqra), thus beginning the revelation of the Qur'an.
- Pope Boniface IV presides over a Council of Rome for the restoration of monastic discipline. Attendees include Mellitus, first bishop of London.
- Columbanus and Gallus begin their missionary work in Bregenz, near Lake Constance (Switzerland).
- John V (the Merciful) becomes patriarch of Alexandria (approximate date).

== Births ==
- Anania Shirakatsi, Armenian astronomer (d. 685)
- Barbatus, bishop of Benevento (approximate date)
- Ergica, king of the Visigoths (approximate date)
- Grimoald, King of the Lombards (approximate date)
- Lai Ji, official of the Tang dynasty (d. 662)
- Nanthild, Frankish queen (approximate date)
- Safiyya bint Huyayy, wife of Muhammad (approximate date)

== Deaths ==
- October 5 – Phocas, Byzantine emperor
- Gisulf II, Lombard duke of Friuli (approximate date)
- Heraclius the Elder, Byzantine general
- Tassilo I, King of Bavaria (b. 560)
- Waraka ibn Nawfal, the paternal first cousin of Khadija, the first wife of the Islamic prophet Muhammad.
- Witteric, king of the Visigoths
