= Oswald, king of the Hwicce =

Anglo-Saxon king

Oswald was a brother of Osric, King of Anglo-Saxon kingdom of Hwicce, a sub-kingdom of Mercia in England.

In a problematic charter, possibly from 679, Oswald and his brother Osric were described as thegns (they are actually referred to as nepotes - usually translated as nephews or grandsons, but here probably meaning step-sons) of Æthelred, King of Mercia.
