= 748 =

Calendar year

748 in various calendars
Gregorian calendar	748; DCCXLVIII
Ab urbe condita	1501
Armenian calendar	197; ԹՎ ՃՂԷ
Assyrian calendar	5498
Balinese saka calendar	669–670
Bengali calendar	154–155
Berber calendar	1698
Buddhist calendar	1292
Burmese calendar	110
Byzantine calendar	6256–6257
Chinese calendar	丁亥年 (Fire Pig); 3445 or 3238 — to — 戊子年 (Earth Rat); 3446 or 3239
Coptic calendar	464–465
Discordian calendar	1914
Ethiopian calendar	740–741
Hebrew calendar	4508–4509
- Hindu calendars
Vikram Samvat	804–805
Shaka Samvat	669–670
Kali Yuga	3848–3849
Holocene calendar	10748
Iranian calendar	126–127
Islamic calendar	130–131
Japanese calendar	Tenpyō 20 (天平２０年)
Javanese calendar	642–643
Julian calendar	748; DCCXLVIII
Korean calendar	3081
Minguo calendar	1164 before ROC 民前1164年
Nanakshahi calendar	−720
Seleucid era	1059/1060 AG
Thai solar calendar	1290–1291
Tibetan calendar	མེ་མོ་ཕག་ལོ་ (female Fire-Boar); 874 or 493 or −279 — to — ས་ཕོ་བྱི་བ་ལོ་ (male Earth-Rat); 875 or 494 or −278

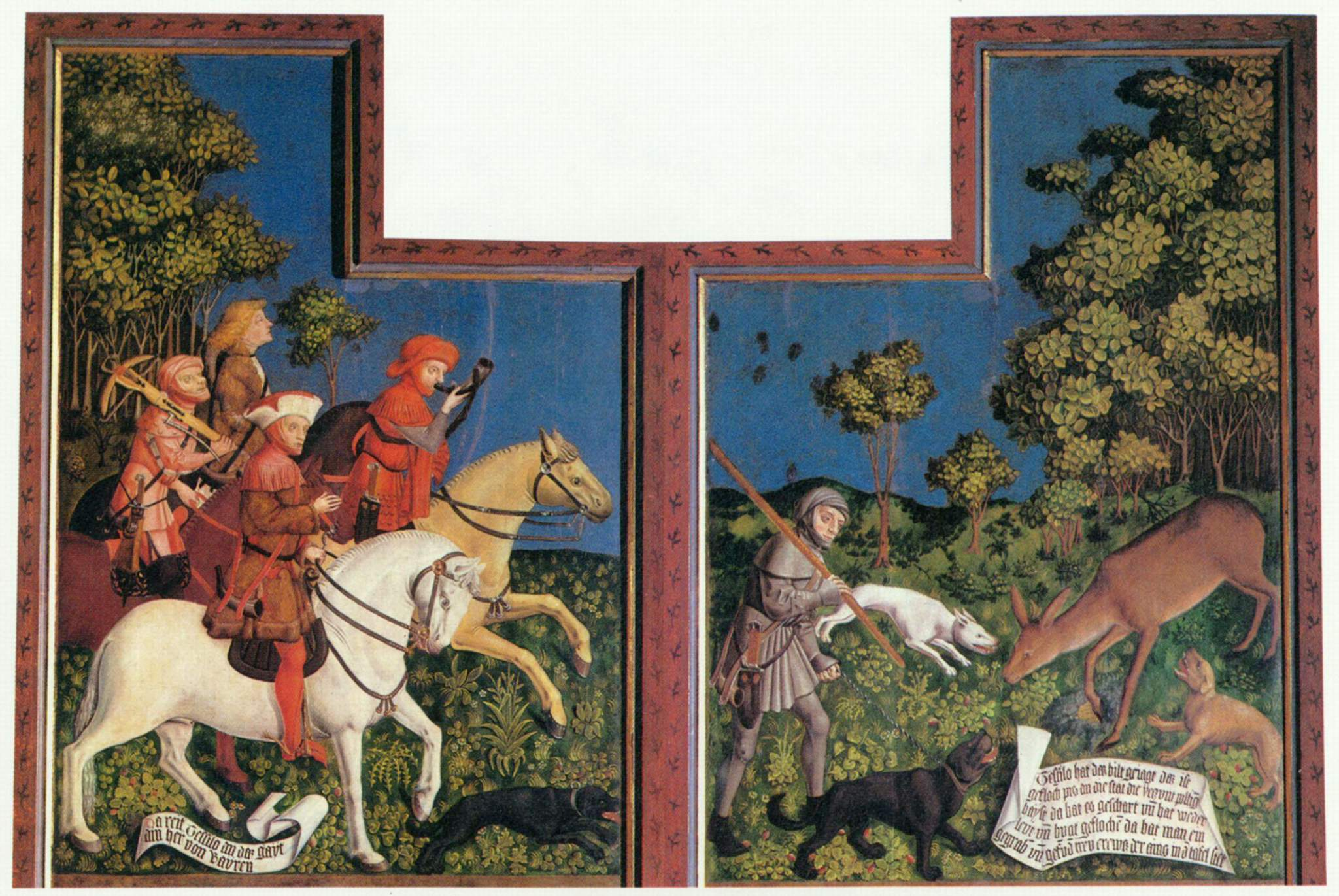
Duke Tassilo III of Bavaria while hunting

Year 748 (DCCXLVIII) was a leap year starting on Monday of the Julian calendar. The denomination 748 for this year has been used since the early medieval period, when the Anno Domini calendar era became the prevalent method in Europe for naming years.

== Events ==
=== By place ===
==== Europe ====
- January 18 – Duke Odilo of Bavaria dies after a 12-year reign. Grifo, youngest son of Charles Martel, seeks to establish his own rule by seizing the duchy for himself, and abducts Odilo's infant son Tassilo III.
- In Rome, Pope Zachary closes down a slave market, where Venetian merchants had been selling Christian captives to the Muslims in North Africa.

==== Britain ====
- King Æthelbert II of Kent sends a message to Boniface, archbishop of Mainz, requesting two well-trained goshawks for hunting. He had earlier made a gift of two falcons and a goshawk to King Æthelbald of Mercia (approximate date).

==== Arabian Empire ====
- February 14 – Abbasid Revolution: The Hashimi rebels under Abu Muslim Khorasani take Merv, capital of the Umayyad province Khorasan (modern Iran), marking the consolidation of the Abbasid revolt. Qahtaba ibn Shabib al-Ta'i takes the cities Nishapur and Rey, defeating an Umayyad army (10,000 men) at Gorgan.
- December 9 – Nasr ibn Sayyar, Arab governor of Khorasan, dies after a 10-year administration in which he has fought vigorously against dissident tribes, Turgesh neighbors, and the Abbasids. Nasr had imposed poll taxes (jizya) on non-Muslims, and introduced a system of land taxation for Muslim Arabs.
- The city of Baalbek (modern Lebanon) is sacked with great slaughter.

==== Asia ====
- An earthquake strikes the Middle East from northern Egypt to northwestern Mesopotamia, destroying many remnants of Byzantine culture (approximate date).

== Births ==
- Al-Waqidi, Muslim historian and biographer (approximate date)
- Charlemagne, king and emperor of the Franks (or 747)

== Deaths ==
- January 18 – Odilo, duke of Bavaria
- May 22 – Genshō, empress of Japan (b. 683)
- December 9 – Nasr ibn Sayyar, Arab general (b. 663)
- Cellan of Clonfert, Irish abbot
- Eadbert I, king of Kent (approximate date)
- Indrechtach mac Dungalaig, king of Brega (Ireland)
- Wasil ibn Ata, Muslim theologian and jurist (b. 700)
