= Berthun of Sussex =

Berthun (died c. 685) was a dux of the South Saxons.

Bede's Historia ecclesiastica gentis Anglorum (book IV, chapter 15) records the invasion of the South Saxon kingdom by Caedwalla of the West Saxons and the killing of the South Saxon king Æthelwalh. Caedwalla was driven off by Berthun and Andhun of Sussex, who then jointly ruled the South Saxons. However, Bede reports, Beorhthun was later killed and the South Saxons conquered by Caedwalla. The Kings & Queens of Britain also states Caedwalla was driven off by Berthun and Andhun, but returned and recaptured the kingdom, killing Berthun c. 685.
