= Æthelwealh of Sussex =

King in Sussex

Æthelwealh
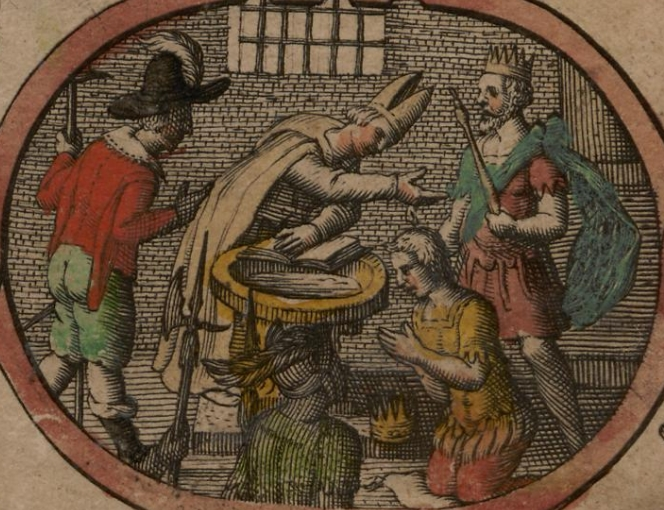
- Imaginary depiction of Æthelwealh from John Speed's 1611 "Saxon Heptarchy"

King of Sussex
- Reign: fl. c. 660 – c. 685
- Predecessor: Cissa
- Successor: ?Eadric (Note: Æthelwealh's succession is problematic. Only William of Malmesbury cites Eadric (possibly mistaken for Eadric of Kent?). (De gestis regum Anglorum Book 1 Ch 34))
- Died: 685
- Spouse: Eafe

Æthelwealh (Note: Also written Aedilualch, Aethelwalch, Aþelwold, Æðelwold, Æþelwald, or Ethelwalch) (/ɑːθəlweɪl/ AH-th-ul-way-l or /ɑːðəlweɪl/ AH-dh-ul-way-l) (fl. c. 660 – c. 685) was the ruler of the ancient South Saxon kingdom from before 674 till his death between 680 and 685. According to the Venerable Bede, Æthelwealh was baptised in Mercia, becoming the first Christian king of Sussex. He was killed by a West Saxon prince, Cædwalla, who eventually became king of Wessex.

== Name ==
The name "Æthelwealh" has two elements to it. "Æthel" is the Old English term for a "noble" or a "prince" as in "Ætheling". The second Old English noun "wealh" originally meant "Celt", but later the term was also used for "slave", "foreigner" or "Romano-Britain". Thus, Æthelwealh possibly meant "Noble Romanised-Briton", which is a contradiction to the narrative. (Note: See Kirby "The Church in Saxon Sussex" for more detail on this.) Academics such as Michael Shapland have suggested that the king was not a Saxon, as his name meant "Noble King of the Britons."

== Background ==
During Æthelwealh's time, the kingdom of the South Saxons was concentrated around the south-west of Sussex in the Selsey area.

Ælle, the first king of the South Saxons, was followed by Cissa of Sussex, according to the Anglo-Saxon Chronicle. There is a 150-year gap between Ælle, whose ancestry can not be established, and Æthelwealh, whose ancestry is more secure.

== Alliance with the Mercians ==
Mercian power was ascending with Wulfhere of Mercia advancing into Jutish southern Hampshire and the Isle of Wight in about 661. Then, according to Bede, Æthelwealh travelled to Mercia to be baptised, becoming the first Christian king of Sussex, with Wulfhere as his godfather. Bede in his Ecclesiastical History of the English People recorded that Æthelwealh also married Eafe, (Note: Also Eabae or Ebba) who was the daughter of Eanfrith, (Note: Also written as Eanfrid or Eanfridi) a ruler of the Christian Hwicce people. Bede goes on to say that Wulfhere presented the Isle of Wight and Meonwara to Æthelwealh. (Note: The Anglo-Saxon Chronicle says that Wulfhere gave the Isle of Wight to Æthelwealh; Bede says both the Isle of Wight and Meonwara.) This alliance between the South Saxons and the Mercians and their control of southern England and the Isle of Wight was a challenge to the West Saxons, whose power base at the time was in the upper Thames area.

In their testimonies, Stephen of Ripon and Bede write that Wilfrid, the exiled bishop of York, came to Sussex in 681 and converted (Note: Some modern academics have suggested that the people of Sussex would have been insular Christians before the arrival of Wilfrid, hypothesising that Wilfrid and Stephen had an anti-insular Christian agenda. See Goffart, Kirby and Shapland for discussion on this) the people of Sussex and the Isle of Wight to Christianity. Æthelwealh gave Wilfrid land in Selsey, where he founded the Episcopal See of the South Saxons with its seat at Selsey Abbey.

== West Saxon takeover ==
Cædwalla was a West Saxon prince who had apparently been banished by Centwine, king of Wessex. Cædwalla had spent his exile in the forests of the Chiltern and the Weald, and at some point had befriended Wilfrid. Cædwalla vowed that if Wilfrid would be his spiritual father, then he would be his obedient son.

According to tradition, (Note: The tradition is based on some Bronze Age barrows at Bow Hill, Sussex. The barrows are known as the "Devils Humps" or the "King's graves". However, there is no supporting evidence for the legends.) Cædwalla invaded Sussex in about 686 and was met by Æthelwealh at a point in the South Downs just southeast of Stoughton, close to the border with Hampshire, and it was here that Æthelwealh was defeated and slain. According to the same tradition, Æthelwealh lies buried in the southern barrow of the group that marks the spot.

The invasion stalled when Cædwalla was driven out by two of Æthelwealh's ealdormen, Berhthun and Andhun. In 687, Cædwalla became King of the West Saxons, and a new invasion of Sussex began; this time it was successful. Bede describes how brutally Cædwalla suppressed the South Saxons.

After his victory, Cædwalla immediately summoned Wilfrid and made him supreme counsellor over his whole kingdom. In 686, when Wilfrid returned north, the see of Selsey was absorbed by the Diocese of the West Saxons, at Winchester. In temporal matters, Sussex was subject to the West Saxon kings, and in ecclesiastical matters, it was subject to the bishops of Winchester.

== Relationship with Kent ==
In Kent, Hlothhere had been ruler since 673/4. This was until his nephew Eadric of Kent revolted against him and went to Sussex, where Æthelwealh helped him to raise a South Saxon army. In about 685, Eadric was able to defeat Hlothhere and become ruler of Kent. On Æthelwealh's death, at the hands of Cædwalla, William of Malmesbury suggests that Eadric became king of the South Saxon kingdom. However, in 686, a West Saxon warband led by Cædwalla and his brother Mul, invaded Kent and removed Eadric from power, making Mul the king of Kent.

== See also ==
- History of Sussex
