= Andhun of Sussex =

Andhun was an Ealdorman of Sussex under King Æðelwealh, who was slain by the Wessex prince Cædwalla, who invaded and ravaged Sussex. Berhthun and Andhun succeeded in driving Caedwalla from the Kingdom.

In 686, the South Saxons attacked Hlothhere, King of Kent, in support of his nephew Eadric, but soon after Berhthun was killed and the kingdom subjugated for a time by Caedwalla, who had now become King of Wessex.
