= List of kings of Dumnonia =

The kings of Dumnonia were the rulers of the large Brythonic kingdom of Dumnonia in the south-west of Great Britain during the Sub-Roman and early medieval periods.

A list of Dumnonian kings is one of the hardest of the major Dark Age kingdoms to accurately compile, as it is confused by Arthurian legend, complicated by strong associations with the kings of Wales and Brittany, and obscured by the Saxon advance. Therefore, this list should be treated with caution.

== Dumnonian kings ==
The original Celtic chiefs of the Dumnonii ruled in the south-west corner of the British Isles until faced with the arrival of the Romans in their territory in c. AD 55, when the Romans established a legionary fortress at Isca Dumnoniorum (modern Exeter). Although subjugated by c. AD 78, the civitas Dumnoniorum was among the regions of Roman Britain least affected by Roman influence. Known as Caer Uisc, Exeter was inhabited by Dumnonian Britons until c. 936, when King Athelstan expelled them. Several other royal residences may also have served the kings of Dumnonia or Cornwall, including Tintagel as the principal one and Cadbury Castle as a temporary one, which also served the purpose of defence.

Legendary 'Dukes of Cornwall' recorded by Geoffrey of Monmouth

- Caradoc (c. 290 – c. 305)
- Donault, brother of Caradoc (c. 305 – c. 340)

Presumed kings appearing in the ancestries of later monarchs

- Conan Meriadoc ap Gereint, '"Conan the Merry" (c. 340 – c. 387)
- Gadeon ap Conan (c. 387 – c. 390)
- Guoremor ap Gadeon (c. 387 – c. 400)
- Tutwal ap Guoremor (c. 400 – c. 410)
- Conomor ap Tutwal (c. 410 – c. 435)
- Constantine Corneu ap Conomar, "Constantine of Cornwall" (c. 435 – c. 443)

Kings recorded in Welsh records and literature

- Erbin ap Constantine (c. 443 – c. 480)
- Geraint Llyngesic ab Erbin, "Gerren the Fleet Owner" (c. 480 – c. 514)
- Cado ap Gerren (c. 514 – c. 530)
- Custennin ap Cado, probably "Saint Custennin" (c. 530 – c. 560)
- Gerren rac Denau ap Custennin, "Gerren for the South" (c. 560 – c. 598)

William of Malmesbury

- Gwrgan: William of Malmesbury reports the terms of a grant of land made by King Gwrgan of Damnonia to the "old church" at Glastonbury in AD 601 in the time of Abbot Worgret.

Possible rulers given in the early 17th-century Book of Baglan as ancestors of an 'Earl of Cornwall'

- Bledric ap Custennin (c. 598 – c. 613)
- Clemen ap Bledric (c. 613 – c. 633)
- Petroc Baladrddellt ap Clemen, "Petroc Splintered Spear" (c. 633 – c. 654)
- Culmin ap Petroc (c. 659 – c. 661)
- Donyarth ap Culmin (c. 661 – c. 700)

Kings recorded in Anglo-Saxon sources

- Geraint (c. 700 – c. 710)

Breton Princes of Armorican Dumnonia, from the Life of Saint Winnoc;

see also Domnonée. (The earlier portion follows the Dumnonian line beginning with Gereint, Cado, Erbin, Guitol ap Gradlon, Marchell, and Riothamus)

- Riwal (510–520)
- Deroch (520–535), son of Riwal
- Iona (535–540), son of Deroch
- Judual (Judwal), son of Iona (540–545)
- Conomor (540–555), count of Poher, first regent, then usurper, possibly Mark of Cornwall
- Judwal (555–580, re-established)
- Judaël (580–605), older son of Judwal
- Haëloc (605–610), younger son of Judaël
- Saint Judicael (r. 610–640, † 647/652), elder son of Judaël, abdicated
- Judoc (r. 640–640, † 669), younger son of Judaël, renounced the throne
- Saint Winnoc (r. 640, † 717), possibly a son of Judicael, renounced the throne.

=== Native tradition ===
Susan Pearce views the only native 4th- to 7th-century Dumnonian rulers known to history as:

- Constantine (Welsh Custennin Gorneu), mentioned in De Excidio et Conquestu Britanniae
- Erbin
- Geraint (Welsh Geraint fab Erbin)
- Cadwy (Cado)

Pearce identifies Constantine with the Constantine mentioned by Gildas, anchoring his reign to the 6th century, and giving later dates for the reigns of Erbin, Geraint, and Cadwy.

== Cornish kings ==
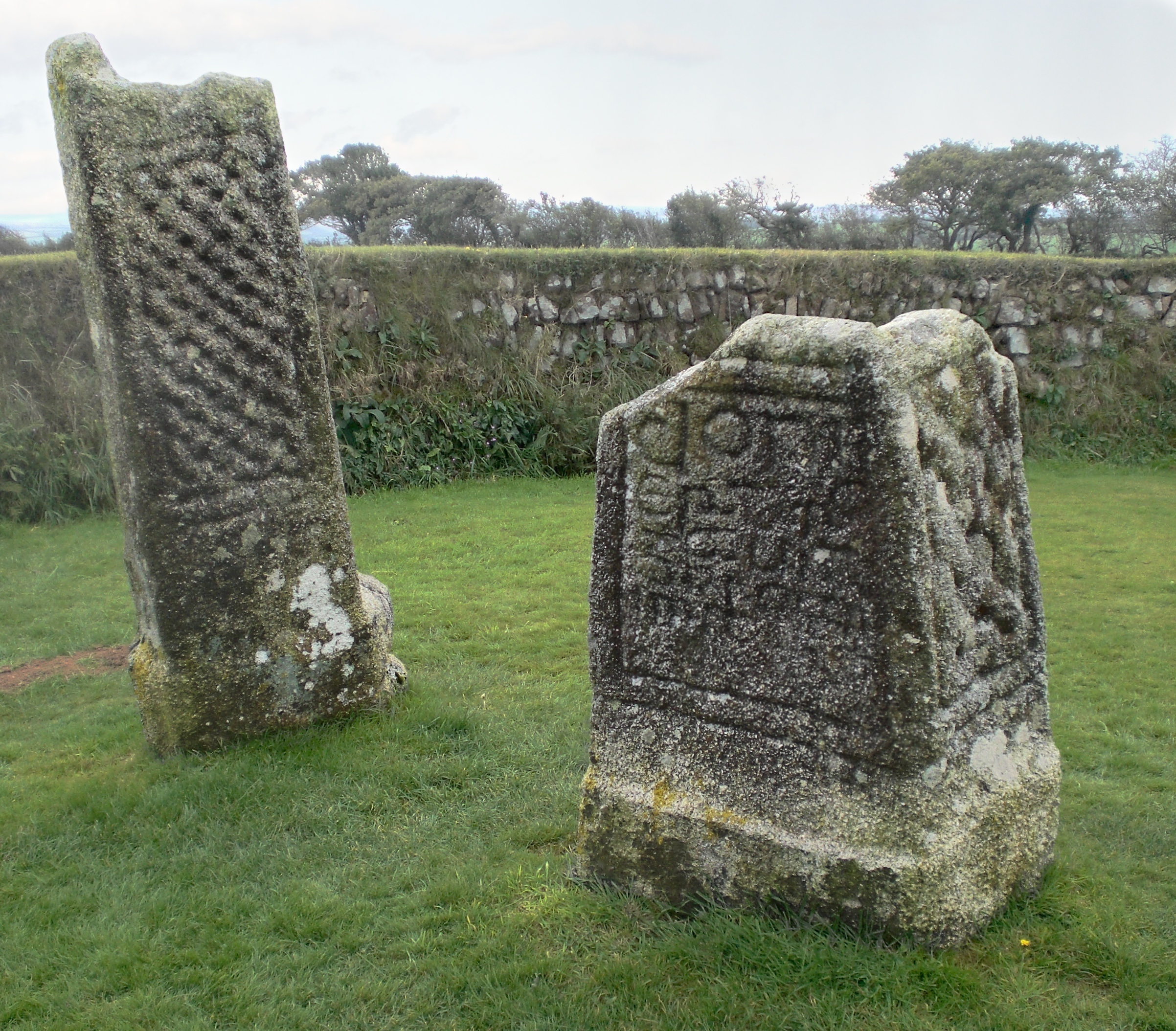
King Doniert's Stone, located near St Cleer, Bodmin Moor, commemorates King Dungarth/Donyarth/Doniert.

By the end of the 8th century, Dumnonia was much reduced in size by the advance of the West Saxons and the remaining territory became a rump state in Cornwall.

Recorded in Old Welsh documents, Saints' Lives and in local and Arthurian tradition

- King Mark – of Tristan and Iseult fame. According to Cornish folklore, he held court at Tintagel.
- King Salomon – father of Saint Cybi, probably ruled after Mark; not to be confused with Salomon, King of Brittany.
- Dungarth – was recorded by the Annales Cambriae as having drowned in 876. The Annales refer to him as "rex Cerniu", King of Cornwall.

In records open to interpretation

- Ricatus (fl. c.900s) is mentioned on a memorial stone; he may have ruled a more localised region.
- Huwal of the West Welsh (c.910–c.926), about whom there has been controversy since the 19th century. He only appears in the Anglo-Saxon Chronicle entry for 927, accepting King Athelstan of Wessex as his overlord. 'West Wales' was an old term for Dumnonia or Cornwall, but may also refer to present day West Wales, then generally known as Deheubarth, where Hywel Dda was king.

The Book of Baglan

An early 17th century pedigree of a so-called 'Earl of Cornwall' in the Book of Baglan may possibly represent a list of rulers in Cornwall.

- Ithel Eiddyn ap Donyarth (Ithel the Rock) (c.710–c.715)
- Dyfnwal Boifunall ap Ithel (Dyfnwal of Boifunall) (fl. c.730s)
- Cawrdolli ap Dyfnwal (fl. c.750s)
- Oswallt ap Cawrdolli (fl. c.770s)
- Hernam ap Oswallt (fl. c.790s)
- Hopkin ap Hernam (fl. c.810s)
- Mordaf ap Hopkin (fl. c.830s)
- Fferferdyn ap Mordaf (fl. c.850s)
- Donyarth (c.865–c.876)
- Eluid ap Fferferdyn (fl. c.880s)
- Alanorus ap Eluid (fl. c.890s)

Others

- Antiquarians from the sixteenth century on recorded claims that Condor – sometimes described as a descendant of the Cornish royal line – paid homage to William I of England at the time of the Norman Conquest in 1066 in order to remain Earl of Cornwall.
- In the De Gestis Herewardi Saxonis written in the 12th century it is recorded that Hereward the Wake took refuge in Cornwall in the 11th century at the court of the Cornish Prince or King Alef.

== Cornish earls ==
If he is not to be identified with Hywel Dda of Deheubarth, the singularly recorded Huwal could have been the last native king. Some of the later supposed rulers listed below are given the title 'Earl of Cornwall'.

- Conan (c.926–c.937)
- Rolope ap Alanorus (fl. c.940s)
- Vortegyn Helin ap Rolope (Vortegyn the High Lord) (fl. c.960s) as 'Duke of Cornwall and Wessex'
- Veffyne ap Vortegyn (fl. c.980s) as 'Duke of Cornwall and Wessex'
- Alured ap Veffyne (fl. c.1000s) as 'Duke of Cornwall and Wessex'
- Godwyn ap Alured (fl. c.1010) as 'Duke of Cornwall and Wessex', possibly Godwin, Earl of Wessex
- Herbert FitzGodwyn (fl. c.1050)
- Condor of Cornwall (pre-1066–c.1068; probably legendary)
- Robert, Comte de Mortain (c.1068–c.1084)
- William FitzRobert (c.1084–c.1106) (opposed by Cadoc ap Cador)
- Cadoc (fl. c.1100; probably legendary)

== Sources ==
- Snyder, Christopher A. (2003). The Britons. Blackwell. ISBN 0-631-22260-X.
- Todd, Malcolm (1987). The South West to AD 1000. A Regional History of England. Longman. ISBN 0-582-49274-2.
