= 592 =

Calendar year

592 in various calendars
- Gregorian calendar: 592; DXCII
- Ab urbe condita: 1345
- Armenian calendar: 41; ԹՎ ԽԱ
- Assyrian calendar: 5342
- Balinese saka calendar: 513–514
- Bengali calendar: −2 – −1
- Berber calendar: 1542
- Buddhist calendar: 1136
- Burmese calendar: −46
- Byzantine calendar: 6100–6101
- Chinese calendar: 辛亥年 (Metal Pig); 3289 or 3082 — to — 壬子年 (Water Rat); 3290 or 3083
- Coptic calendar: 308–309
- Discordian calendar: 1758
- Ethiopian calendar: 584–585
- Hebrew calendar: 4352–4353
- Hindu calendars
- Vikram Samvat: 648–649
- Shaka Samvat: 513–514
- Kali Yuga: 3692–3693
- Holocene calendar: 10592
- Iranian calendar: 30 BP – 29 BP
- Islamic calendar: 31 BH – 30 BH
- Javanese calendar: 481–482
- Julian calendar: 592; DXCII
- Korean calendar: 2925
- Minguo calendar: 1320 before ROC 民前1320年
- Nanakshahi calendar: −876
- Seleucid era: 903/904 AG
- Thai solar calendar: 1134–1135
- Tibetan calendar: ལྕགས་མོ་ཕག་ལོ་ (female Iron-Boar); 718 or 337 or −435 — to — ཆུ་ཕོ་བྱི་བ་ལོ་ (male Water-Rat); 719 or 338 or −434

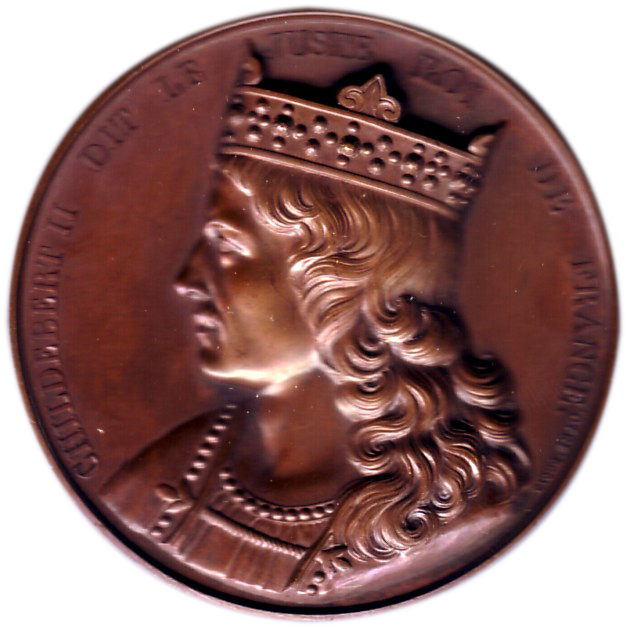
King Childebert II (570–595)

Year 592 (DXCII) was a leap year starting on Tuesday of the Julian calendar. The denomination 592 for this year has been used since the early medieval period, when the Anno Domini calendar era became the prevalent method in Europe for naming years.

== Events ==
=== By place ===
==== Byzantine Empire ====
- Emperor Maurice regains the Byzantine stronghold Singidunum (modern Belgrade) from the Avars. By counter-invading their homelands on the Balkans, Byzantine troops increase their pay by pillaging in hostile territory.

==== Europe ====
- January 28 – King Guntram, age 59, dies after a 31-year reign, and is succeeded by his nephew Childebert II, who becomes ruler of Burgundy. He is buried at Saint Marcellus of Chalons Church, in Chalon-sur-Saône (Eastern France).
- Ariulf becomes the second Duke of Spoleto (Central Italy).

==== Britain ====
- Battle of Woden's Burg: After the mass killing at Woden's Burg, near Marlborough (South West England), Ceawlin is deposed as king of the West Saxons. His son Cuthwine is taken prisoner and goes into exile.
- Ceol succeeds his uncle Ceawlin after his defeat at Woden's Burg. He becomes king of Wessex (according to the Anglo-Saxon Chronicle).

==== Asia ====
- Summer – Emperor Wéndi reduces taxes, due to an overflowing abundance of food and silk in the governmental stores. He sends messengers around central China, redistributing land to give the poor farming land.
- December 8 – Emperor Sushun of Japan is murdered after 5 years on the throne by agents of his rival Umako Soga, who is jealous of the emperor's power. He is succeeded by Suiko, widow of the late emperor Bidatsu.
- Winter – Empress Suiko moves the imperial capital of Japan to Asuka-Toyura Palace (Nara Prefecture) during the Asuka period.

=== By topic ===
==== Literature ====
- Gregory, bishop of Tours, completes his Historia Francorum ("History of the Franks").

== Births ==
- Khalid ibn al-Walid, Arab general (approximate date)
- Asmā' bint Abi Bakr, companion of Muhammad
- Cutha Cathwulf, prince of Wessex (approximate date)
- Itta, wife of Pepin of Landen (d. 652)
- Xu Jingzong, chancellor of the Tang dynasty (d. 672)

== Deaths ==
- January 28 – Guntram, king of Burgundy
- Faroald I, duke of Spoleto (Italy)
- Sushun, emperor of Japan
