= Clemen ap Bledric =

7th-century Brythonic ruler

- King of Dumnonia
- Reign: c. 613 - c. 630
- Predecessor: Bledric ap Custennin
- Successor: Petroc Baladrddellt
- Born: c. 580
- Issue: Petroc Baladrddellt
- Father: Bledric ap Custennin

Clemen ap Bledric (also known as Clement or Clemens) was a 7th-century King of Dumnonia (now the English West Country).

== Family, life and rule ==
Born about 580, the son of Bledric ap Custennin, Clemen ruled after his father was killed by King Æthelfrith of Northumbria at the Battle of Bangor-is-Coed (Bangor-on-Dee, Powys Fadog) in about 613. He married the daughter of Guitoli ap Urbgen, who was possibly a great-grandson of the late king Gerren Llyngesic, and they had one known son, Petroc Baladrddellt (“Splintered Spear”) - although, according to the Welsh Bonedd y Saint (Genealogies of the Saints), Clemen was the father of St Petroc, other authorities state that this saint lived around a century earlier, the princely son of King Glywys of Glywysing, making it likely Clemen was actually the father of Petroc Baladrddellt.

Some authors have Tewdwr (or Teudu) son of Peredur ruling as king in the fl. 620s, descended from a different line of Dumnonian kings from Gerren Llyngesic's son Cado ap Gerren. This is as given in the Jesus College, Oxford, MS 20, although this line ends with a Judhael as Tewdwr's grandson, almost certainly Judicael, High King of the Bretons, and king of Domnonia in Brittany.

== Battle of Beandun ==
Clemen was probably king in 614 when the Britons fought the Battle of Beandun (sometimes thought to be Bindon near Axmouth in Devon but more likely to be in Somerset given the location of the earlier (577) victory at the Battle of Deorham) when, the Anglo-Saxon Chronicle tells us, King Cynegils and his son Cwichelm of Wessex invaded Dumnonia. 614 is also the year that which the peace was broken on the borders of Glevissig (Glywysing), suggesting the Dumnonians co-ordinated their efforts with the kings of South Wales, such as Nynnio ap Erb who was probably ruling Gwent and Glywysing at the time.

The West Saxon army was said to have killed 2,065 British: however this figure seems suspect upon examination. Peter Marren estimates Norman casualties at the battle of Hastings to have been around 2000 men, representing a large multinational force in one of the largest battles of the age. Therefore, for Wessex to have slain this many men would represent an enormous victory that should have been total. However, very little seems to change as the Anglo Saxon Chronicle records in 652 Cenwalth fighting at Bradford Upon Avon against an unknown foe very likely to be the Britons.

== Siege of Exeter ==
Clemen may have been reigning in 630-632 when, according to Geoffrey of Monmouth's Historia Regum Britanniae, King Penda of Mercia besieged Exeter until the exiled King Cadwallon of Gwynedd arrived to defeat the Mercians. The three kings are said to have made an alliance and marched north to face the armies of Northumbria which were then occupying Gwynedd: Exeter was in the kingdom of Dumnonia, and Cadwallon is said to have made an alliance with Dumnonia's nobility though Clemen's name is not mentioned.

Today's reputable historians do not mention this siege at all, considering it together with the rest of Historia Regum Britanniae as one of Geoffrey of Monmouth's many colourful inventions.

== Battle of Cefn Digoll ==
Clemen may have fought at the Battle of Cefn Digoll (Long Mountain, near Welshpool in Gwynedd) in alliance with Gwynedd and Mercia, against Northumbrian domination in 630. It is not known whether the Dumnonians were part of the British army that went on to ravage Northumbria over the following years.

== Literature ==
He is also given in Llyfr Baglan (Book of Baglan) as a Duke of Cornwall, son of Bredrice (e.g. Bledric) and father of Pedroc (e.g. Petroc).

Regnal titles
Preceded by Bledric ap Custennin	King of Dumnonia c. 613–c. 630	Succeeded by Petroc Baladrddellt
