= Cuthwulf (son of Cuthwine) =

6th c Prince of House of Wessex

Cuthwulf, also sometimes Cutha (fl. 592–648), was the third son of Cuthwine, and consequently a member of the House of Wessex. Although a member of the direct male line from Cynric to Egbert (see House of Wessex family tree), Cuthwulf was never king. He is said to have been born circa 592, and his death date is unknown.

His brothers were Cynebald and Cedda; his son was Ceolwald of Wessex; nothing more of his life is known.

Due to the similarity of his name to his father's name, and the shadowy nature of early Anglo-Saxon genealogies, it appears that he was often confused with his father Cuthwine. For example, Caedwalla was said to be the son of Cedda and the grandson of Cutha, where Cutha here presumably refers to Cuthwine, since Cedda is also said to be the brother of Cuthwulf.

== Early life ==
Cuthwulf was born in tumultuous times. He was the third son of Cuthwine, son of Ceawlin, son of Cynric, the son of Cerdic, the first of the Saxons to come across the sea from Germany; and he and his people were still relatively out of place in a world dominated by the Britons. He was born in the final year of his father's time as prince of the Saxons.

Ceawlin lost the throne of Wessex in June 592. The annal for that year in the Anglo-Saxon Chronicle reads, at least in part: “Here there was great slaughter at Woden’s Barrow, and Ceawlin was driven out.” Woden's Barrow is a tumulus, now called Adam's Grave, at Alton Priors, Wiltshire. His opponent was Ceol, the next king of Wessex, who ruled for six years. The origins of the battle are unclear; it is probable that nothing more than greed and a lust for power motivated Ceol. Cuthwine, then twenty-seven, was a commander in the fateful battle; but upon defeat, as the rightful heir to the throne, he fled the place along with his young sons.

The following year (593) saw the deaths of Ceawlin and all his brothers in unclear circumstances, although most likely in another battle. Cuthwine escaped from this defeat also, and went into exile to the east with his young family. If Ceol and Ceolwulf made efforts to eradicate the members of the original branch of the ruling family, they were unsuccessful. At any rate the Cuthwines remained at large during this period, far from fugitives after the first few years of their supposed exile.

Ceol, described as a ruthless leader, was a son of another prince called Cutha (the brother of Ceawlin and a son of Cynric) and hence a cousin of Cuthwine; and Ceolwulf, his brother, reigned for seventeen years after him. Great fragmentation of control among the West Saxons occurred at this time: Ceol and Ceolwulf were in control of Wiltshire, as opposed to the upper Thames valley where Cuthwine and his household were almost certainly based.

Cuthwulf had two brothers; Cynebald, born 585, and Cedda, born 590. The name of their mother is not recorded, but it is possible that she died in the tumult surrounding Cuthwine's flight into exile given that Cuthwine had no more children after that time.

== Later life ==
Details about the activities of Cuthwulf during most of his life in exile are very hard to come by. He and his brothers remained in a powerful position throughout the reign of Cynegils, son of Ceol; and then Cenwalh, son of Cynegils, became king. In the year 645 Penda of Mercia overran the kingdom (in return for Cenwalh's repudiation of Penda's sister) and was for three years king, sending Cenwalh into exile in East Anglia. Cathwulf is recorded as having been present at the negotiations along with his brothers (although some sources say it was Cuthwine, which could of course mean his father), but little more is known of his activities. Nevertheless, much can be deduced. If this experienced prince was not the sole ruler of Wessex during the years of Cenwalh's exile (naturally in a subservient position to Penda) then it is likely that he was a member of the ruling body; but, given the tangled diplomacy of the times and his eastern power base, it is equally likely that he aided Cenwalh in his successful attempt to regain the throne in 648.

After this, he appears infrequently as a shadowy figure, apparently already passing into legend among the common people as a result of his long-held position against the (at times) brutal role of Ceol and his family. He probably died sometime during the second period of Cenwalh's reign, as he would have been past eighty by the year 672 when Cenwalh died, and there are no records of him doing anything in the turbulent times succeeding Cenwalh's death. It seems inconceivable that he would have lived to see the reinstatement of his line to the throne of Wessex.

This enigmatic prince and his long roster of descendants were not forgotten by the West Saxons, however. When the line of Ceol finally became extinct, first Caedwalla of Wessex and then Ine of Wessex became king; the first a great-nephew, and the second a grandson of Cuthwulf. Nowadays he occurs in many places simply as one of a long list of names in the descent from Egbert back to the dawn of time, but it is thanks to him that this continuous descent can be traced at all.

== Family and move to Devon ==
In about the year 620 it appears that the upper Thames valley where the household of Cuthwulf was based became too small to comfortably hold the three brothers. As the youngest, Cuthwulf was the one who was forced to move - at any rate this is a sensible deduction given that he later turns up in what is now east Devon, on the western marches of Wessex and in constant conflict with Dumnonia. This was a Celtic tribe that inhabited Cornwall, although in Cuthwulf's time their sphere of influence was much greater, extending over most of what is now Devon as well. The chronology of English dominance over Cornwall is unclear, but inevitably at about this time Cornwall came into conflict with the westerly-expanding kingdom of Wessex. There are no recorded charters or legal agreements showing Cornwall as part of Wessex. Furthermore, there is little economic, military, social, cultural or archaeological evidence that Wessex established control over Cornwall, certainly not in those early days.

The Britons in Dumnonia were cut off from their allies in Wales by Ceawlin of Wessex's victory at Dyrham in 577, but since sea travel was easier than land, the blow may not have been severe. Clemen ap Bledric is thought to have been king when the Britons fought the Battle of Beandun (possibly Bindon near Axmouth in east Devon) in 614. The battle site suggests that the Dumnonian army was invading Wessex using the Roman road eastward from Exeter to Dorchester and was intercepted by a West Saxon garrison marching south. The Flores Historiarum, attributed incorrectly to Matthew of Westminster, states that the Britons were still in possession of Exeter in 632, when it was bravely defended against Penda of Mercia until relieved by Cadwallon, who engaged and defeated the Mercians with "great slaughter to their troops". Geoffrey of Monmouth also details an account of the siege in his pseudo-historic Historia Brittonum, stating that Cadwallon made an alliance with the British nobility.

From this circumstantial evidence comes further consolidation that the boundary between Wessex and Dumnonia ran through east Devon, more or less where Cuthwulf was based. A theory can thus be deduced; that Cuthwulf, unwelcome in the lands of his brothers or in the land closely controlled by the king Cynegils, was forced to move to the very edges of the kingdom. He and his people may even have been sent there in the hope that they would be killed by the Dumnonians.

The date of the move is unclear, although if it was before 614 then Cuthwulf would have been the West Saxon commander at the Battle of Beandun mentioned above. This seems likely.

It is possible that Cuthwulf married a Dumnonian princess Gwynhafar, almost certainly a daughter of Clemen ap Bledric, as part of an alliance, possibly the one mentioned above by Geoffrey of Monmouth or an earlier one.

== See also ==
- House of Wessex family tree
