= Bledric ap Custennin =

6th-century Brythonic ruler

- King of Dumnonia
- Reign: c. 598 - c. 613
- Successor: Clemen ap Bledric
- Died: c. 613; River Dee, Wales
- Issue: Clemen ap Bledric; Blethyn ap Bledric
- Father: Constantine

Bledric ap Custennin (also known as Blederic, Bredrice, Peledric, Bletius, Bledrys, Bledrig, Bletricius or Bledericus) was a 6th- and 7th-century ruler of Dumnonia (now part of the English West Country).

== Life and rule ==
The actual status and reality of Bledric is difficult to ascertain as most his references are in old Welsh literature variously known as "King", "Duke" or "Prince" of Devonshire and/or Cornwall. He was described as Duke of Cornwall by c.603, and an ally of northern Welsh kings.

The fullest account of Bledric's life comes from Geoffrey of Monmouth's pseudohistorical Historia Regum Britanniae where he is numbered amongst the legendary Dukes of Cornwall. Here Bledric, Duke of Cornwall, was the commander of the allied British armies which included King Cadvan of North Wales (Cadfan ap Iago of Gwynedd) and King Margadud of South Wales (probably Maredydd ap Rhain of Dyfed) at the Battle of Bangor-is-Coed. He joined battle with the army of Æthelfrith of Northumbria who had just slain 1200 monks, and succeeded in wounding Æthelfrith and defeating the Angles but being slain himself.

Some authors have Peredur, son of Cado ap Gerren, ruling as king in the fl. 7th century, descended from a different line of Dumnonian kings from Gerren Llyngesic. This is as given in the Dumnonian king-list derived from Jesus College, Oxford, MS 20.

== Family ==
Bledric was one of three sons of king Constantine (or Custennin) who died in c.560, his brothers being Gerren rac Denau, who he may have succeeded as king, and Domuel (or Dywel). He also had a sister who married Peibio Clafrog, king of Ergyng in South Wales. Bledric may have had two sons, Clemen as given in the Llyfr Baglan (Book of Baglan) who is thought to have succeeded him, and Blethyn as given by Caradoc of Llancarfan.

== Death ==
Caradoc of Llancarfan, in his Historie of Cambria (History of Wales), notes that Bledric was one of the British leaders killed by King Æthelfrith of Northumbria and King Æthelberht of Kent at Bangor on the River Dee in c.613, where he is described as the Prince of Devonshire and Cornwall. It is said that 'by the valiant forgoings of his life got his partners the victory'. His sons apparently went on to 'enjoy the government of North Wales ever since Cadfan ap Iago was chief King in Britain.' Caradoc of Llancarfan also gives Bledric's descendants elsewhere and gives Blethyn (or Bleddyn) as his son and Ednowen (or Ednowain) as his grandson.

== Literature ==
Bledric may also appear in one of the Welsh Triads. Triad 69, the 'Three Defilements of the Severn' give the second as 'the gift of Golydan from Einiawn son of Bedd, king of Cornwall', although given the genealogy of Caradoc of Llancarfan, this could be his supposed son Bleddyn who was recorded as father of Ednowain.

He is also given in Llyfr Baglan as a Duke of Cornwall, son of Constantine, High King of Britain (e.g. Custennin) and father of Clement (e.g. Clemen), Duke of Cornwall.

Regnal titles
Preceded by Gerren rac Denau	King of Dumnonia c. 598–c. 613	Succeeded by Clemen ap Bledric
Legendary titles
Unknown Last known title holder: Constantine	Duke of Cornwall	Unknown
