= History of Devon =

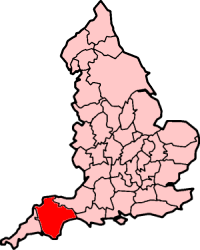
Ancient extent of Devon

Devon is a county in south west England, bordering Cornwall to the west with Dorset and Somerset to the east. There is evidence of occupation of the county from the Stone Age onwards. Its recorded history starts in the Roman period, when it was a civitas. It was then a separate kingdom for a number of centuries until it was incorporated into early England. It has remained a largely agriculture-based region ever since, though tourism is now very important.

== Prehistory ==
Devon was one of the first areas of Great Britain settled following the end of the last ice age. Kents Cavern in Torbay is one of the earliest places in England known to have been occupied by modern man. Dartmoor is thought to have been settled by Mesolithic hunter-gatherer peoples from about 6000 BC, and they later cleared much of the oak forest, which regenerated as moor. In the Neolithic era, from about 3500 BC, there is evidence of farming on the moor, and also building and the erection of monuments, using the large granite boulders that are ready to hand there; Dartmoor contains the remains of the oldest known buildings in England. There are over 500 known Neolithic sites on the moor, in the form of burial mounds, stone rows, stone circles and ancient settlements such as the one at Grimspound. Stone rows are a particularly striking feature, ranging in length from a few metres to over 3 km. Their ends are often marked by a cairn, a stone circle, or a standing stone (see menhir). Because most of Dartmoor was not ploughed during the historic period, the archaeological record is relatively easy to trace.

The name "Devon" derives from the tribe of Celtic people who inhabited the south-western peninsula of Britain at the time of the Roman invasion in 43 AD, the Dumnonii: possibly meaning "deep valley dwellers" (Cornish: Dewnens, Welsh: Dyfnaint, Breton: Devnent) or "worshippers of the god Dumnonos". This tribal name carried on into the Roman and post-Roman periods. The Dumnonii did not mint coins, unlike their neighbours to the east, the Durotriges, but coins of the Dobunni have been found in the area.

There was a Bronze Age trading port at Mount Batten in Plymouth Sound.

=== Archaeology ===
In February 2022, archaeologists led by Rob Bourn, managing director of Orion Heritage, announced the discovery of the remains of a woolly mammoth, reindeer, rhinoceros, bison, wolf and hyena in a cave system during the building of a new town named Sherford. Over 200 clusters of bones were removed by the explorers to analyse the life in Ice Age in Britain. Remains of a tusk, molar tooth, other bones of a woolly mammoth, a partial skull and a mandible of a woolly rhinoceros date to the middle of the last ice age between 60,000 and 30,000 years ago.

== Roman period ==
Devon was not as heavily Romanized as Somerset and Dorset, with the majority of the occupation's traces being in the Exeter area, where the Roman fortifications can still be seen. It is likely a settlement at Exeter of some sort pre-existed the Romans and that the local Brythonic tribe inhabiting the area, the Dumnonii, maintained a tradition of independence. It appears that initially the Dumnonii tribe of Britons were a client kingdom of Rome, but from about AD 55 the Romans held at least part of the area under military occupation, maintaining a naval port at Topsham and a garrison of the 2nd Augustan Legion at Exeter, which they called 'Isca'. This banked and palisaded fortress contained mostly barracks and workshops, but also a magnificent bath-house and was occupied for approximately twenty years. Then the legion moved to Caerleon and the civilians of the surrounding settlement took control. All the associated trappings of local government followed, such as a forum and basilica and, eventually a stone city wall. The Roman administration stayed here for over three centuries. There were several smaller forts across the county and a number of pagan shrines, as remembered in the name of the Nymet villages (Nemeton), but the lands west of the Exe remained largely un-Romanized. The higher status locals there often lived in banked homesteads known as 'Rounds', while East Devon had a number of luxurious villas, such as that discovered at Holcombe, as well as Roman roads of the sophisticated cobbled type.

== Post Roman Independence ==
After the end of Roman rule in Britain in about 410, the kingdom of Dumnonia emerged, covering Devon, Cornwall and Somerset, based on the former Roman civitas and named after the pre-Roman Dumnonii. Gildas criticised King Constantine, who was probably a second generation ruler of Dumnonia in the early sixth century. The Roman episcopal structure survived, and shortly before 705 Aldhelm, abbot of Malmesbury, wrote a letter to King Geraint of Dumnonia and his bishops.

Exeter, known as "Caer Uisc", may have been central to the kingdom, but some historians and antiquaries have speculated that the Kings of Dumnonia may have been itinerant with no fixed capital and moved their court from place to place. The Welsh Triads name Celliwig in Cornwall as a possible site of a royal court; another is High Peak, close to Sidmouth. The former Roman city of Exeter may have become an ecclesiastical centre, as evidenced by a sub-Roman cemetery discovered near the cathedral.

== Anglo-Saxon conquest of Dumnonia ==
Dumnonia remained intact in the sixth century, but it lost territory to Wessex in the mid-seventh. The historian Henry Loyn comments that the conquest of Devon was "probably swift, set in motion by the West Saxons about 660, and virtually complete by the death of King Ine in 725." By 682 they had reached the Quantocks (in what is now Somerset) and were pressing forward into the coastal plain. The West Saxons were presumably in control of Exeter by the 680s, when Boniface received his education at a monastery with a leader using an Anglo-Saxon name. Dumnonia still retained part of Devon at this time, and before he became a bishop in 705, Aldhelm wrote on behalf of a council to King Geraint of Dumnonia and his bishops. In 710, Ine defeated Geraint, who was the last recorded king of Devon.

Despite military control the Laws of Ine made provision for the Wealhas, the "Welsh" foreigners (Wealhas here meaning indigenous western Britons), some of whom retained positions of responsibility.

Campaigns by King Ecgberht of Wessex in Devon between 813 and 822 appear to have resulted in the defeat of the West Wealhas, but not their complete disposition. William of Malmesbury reports negotiations between King Alfred of Wessex and King Dungarth of the Cornish in c. 876 held somewhere near Exmoor in Devon; presumably Alfred would have sought reassurances over his western frontier as he conspired to defeat the Danes.

In the eighth century there was an apparent large-scale replacement of British placename by English ones in Devon whilst other British names may have been "anglicised" over time, such as Landkey.

== Devon in Anglo-Saxon times ==
A Map of British Kingdoms circa 800 AD

By the 9th century, the major threat to peace in Devon came from Viking raiders. Thus Alfred the Great refortified Exeter as a defensive burh, followed by new fortifications at Lydford, Halwell and Pilton, although these were relatively small compared to burhs further east; suggesting these were protection for only the elite. Edward the Elder built similarly at Barnstaple and Totnes. The English defeated a combined Cornish and Danish force at Callington in 832. Sporadic Viking incursions continued, however, until the Norman Conquest, including the disastrous defeat of the Devonians at the Battle of Pinhoe in 1001. A few Norse placenames remain as a result, for example Lundy Island. The men of Devon are said by Asser to have fought the Danes at the Battle of Cynwit in 878, which may have been at Kenwith Castle or Countisbury, although Cannington in Somerset is also claimed as the site of the battle. In 894, the Danes attempted to besiege Exeter but were driven off by Alfred; however it was sacked in 1001.

Devon was originally part of the bishopric of Winchester, but in around 705 the see was divided and a separate bishopric of Sherborne was established, covering Devon, Dorset and Somerset, with Aldhelm as its first bishop. In about 910 the bishopric was again divided, with each county getting its own bishopric. Eadwulf became the first Bishop of Crediton. In 1050 King Edward the Confessor combined Devon and Cornwall and Leofric was appointed Bishop of Exeter.

== Norman and medieval period ==
Immediately after the Norman Conquest, William the Conqueror recognised the importance of securing the loyalty of the West Country and thus the need to secure Exeter. The city withstood an eighteen-day siege and the new king was only eventually allowed to enter upon honourable terms.

The many great estates subsequently held by William's barons in Devon were known as "honours". Chief amongst them were Plympton, Okehampton, Barnstaple, Totnes and Harberton. In the 12th century, the honour of Plympton, along with the Earldom of Devon, was given to the Redvers family. In the following century, it passed to the Courtenays, who had already acquired Okehampton, and in 1335 they received the earldom too. It was also in the 14th century that the Dukedom of Exeter was bestowed on the Holland family, but the dukedom became extinct in the reign of Edward IV. The ancestors of Sir Walter Raleigh, who was born at East Budleigh, held considerable estates in the county from a similar period. Devon was given an independent sheriff. Originally an hereditary appointment, this was later held for a year only. In 1320, the locals complained that all the hundreds of Devon were under the control of the great lords who did not appoint sufficient bailiffs for their proper government.

During the civil war of King Stephen's reign, the castles of Plympton and Exeter were held against the king by Baldwin de Redvers in 1140. Conflict resurfaced in the 14th and 15th centuries, when the French made frequent raids on the Devon coast; and during the Wars of the Roses, when there were frequent skirmishes between the Lancastrian Earl of Devon and the Yorkist Lord Bonville. In 1470, Edward IV pursued Warwick and Clarence as far as Exeter after the Battle of Lose-coat Field. Warwick eventually escaped to France via Dartmouth. Later, Richard III travelled to Exeter to personally punish those who had inflamed the West against him. Several hundred were outlawed, including the Bishop and the Dean.

Dartmoor and Exmoor (mainly in Somerset [71%]) were Royal Forests, i.e. hunting preserves. The men of Devon paid 5000 marks (£3,333) to have these deforested in 1242. The 11th to 14th centuries were a period of economic and population growth, but the Black Death in 1348 and subsequent years caused decline in both, with resulting social change; many villages and hamlets such as 12th century Hound Tor were said to have been deserted, whilst new settlements were later granted to the rising class of tenant farmers exemplified by the surviving 14th century Dartmoor longhouse settlement at Higher Uppacott, and peasant farmers subsequently prospered with large flocks of sheep and cattle. Towns such as Totnes were particularly noted for their wealth derived from the wool and tin trade with the Continent in this period.

== Tudor and Stuart period ==
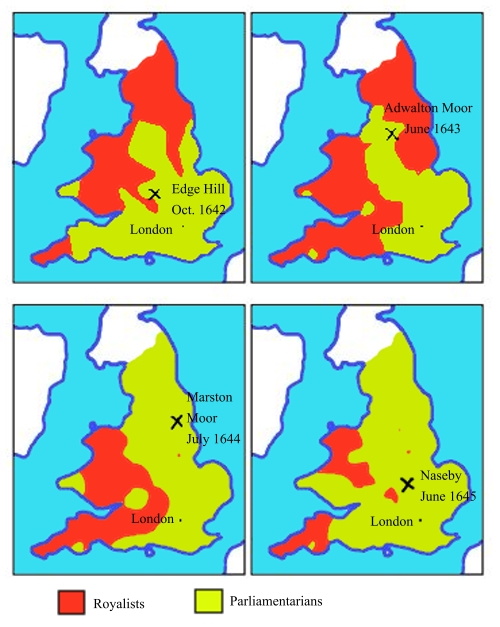
Maps of territory held by Royalists (red) and Parliamentarians (yellow), 1642 — 1645

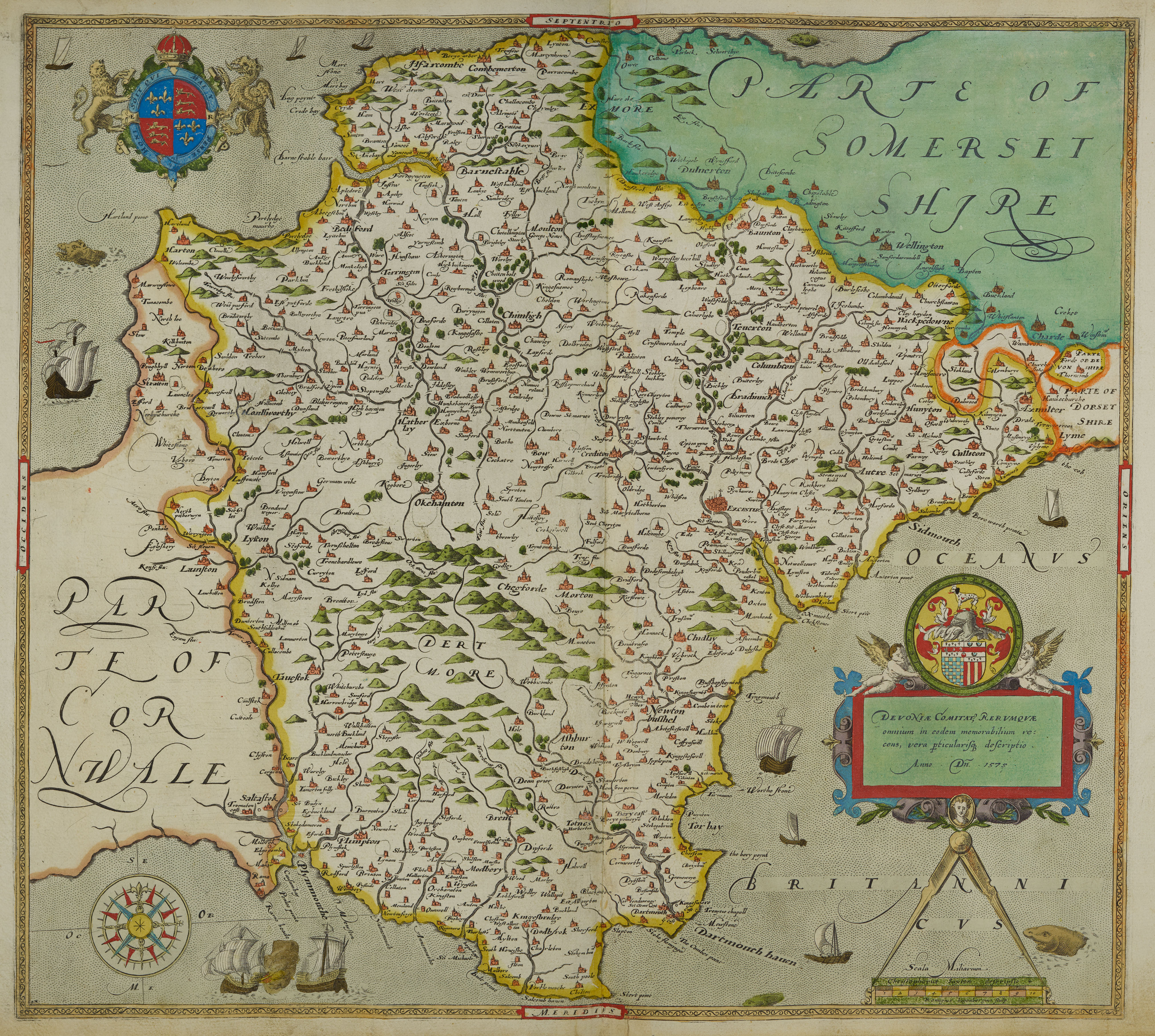
Atlas of Devon by Christopher Saxton from 1575

Early in Henry VII's reign, the royal pretender, Perkin Warbeck, besieged Exeter in 1497. The King himself came down to judge the prisoners and to thank the citizens for their loyal resistance.

Great disturbances throughout the county followed the introduction of Edward VI's Book of Common Prayer. The day after Whit Sunday 1549, a priest at Sampford Courtenay was persuaded to read the old mass. This insubordination spread swiftly into serious revolt. The Cornish quickly joined the men of Devon in the Prayer Book Rebellion and Exeter suffered a distressing siege until relieved by Lord Russell.

Devon is particularly known for its Elizabethan mariners, such as Sir Francis Drake, Sir Richard Grenville and Sir Walter Raleigh. Plymouth Hoe is famous as the location where Drake continued to play bowls after hearing that the Spanish Armada had been sighted. Plymouth was also the final departure point for the Mayflower in 1620, although the settlers themselves were mainly drawn from Nottinghamshire and Lincolnshire.

During the Civil War, the cities of Devon largely favoured the Parliamentarian cause, and by and large the rural areas favoured the Royalists. but there was a great desire for peace in the region and, in 1643 a treaty for the cessation of hostilities in Devon and Cornwall was agreed. Only small-scale skirmishes continued until the capture of Dartmouth and Exeter in 1646 by Sir Thomas Fairfax. He then captured Tiverton and defeated Lord Hopeton's army at Torrington. The last place held for the king was Charles Fort at Salcombe.

After the Monmouth Rebellion in 1685, Judge Jefferies held one of his ‘bloody assizes’ at Exeter. In 1688, the Prince of Orange first landed in England at Brixham (where his statue stands in the town harbour) to launch the Glorious Revolution and his journey to London to claim the English throne as William III. He was entertained for several days at both Forde and at Exeter.

== Modern period ==
In the modern period, since 1650, the city of Plymouth has grown considerably, becoming the largest city in Devon, mainly due to the naval base at Devonport to its west. Plymouth played an important role as a naval port in both World War I and World War II. South Devon was a training and assembly area during World War II for the D-Day landings, and there is a memorial to the many soldiers who were killed during a rehearsal off Slapton Sands. Both Plymouth and Exeter suffered badly from bombing during the war, and the centre of Exeter and vast swathes of Plymouth had to be largely rebuilt during the 1960s.

Cold winters were a feature of the 17th century, that of 1676 being particularly hard. There were smallpox epidemics in the 1640s, 1710s and 1760s, resulting in many deaths. In October 1690 there was an earthquake in Barnstaple. Daniel Defoe published an account of a tour through Devon in 1724 and 1727. South Devon impressed him, but he thought that north Devon was wild, barren and poor.

During the Napoleonic War a prison was built at Princetown on Dartmoor to hold French and American prisoners of war. This prison is still in use.

In 1842 the population was said to be mainly employed in agriculture. The population rose in the 19th century, but the rate of increase was only around half that of the population of England and Wales as a whole.

In the 19th and 20th centuries, Devon has experienced great changes, including the rise of the tourist industry on the so-called English Riviera, decline of farming and fishing, urbanisation, and also proliferation of holiday homes, for example in Salcombe. Devon has become famous for its clotted cream and cider. Dartmoor has become a National Park, as has Exmoor.

Devon has suffered many severe storms, including one that largely swept away Hallsands in 1917.

East Devon established new towns including Marlcombe and Cranbrook in the 21st century.

Politically Devon has had a tendency to lean towards the Conservative and Liberal/Liberal-Democrat parties.

== Mining history ==
Devon has produced tin, copper and other metals from ancient times. Until about 1300 it produced more than Cornwall, but production declined with the opening of the deep Cornish mines. Tin was found largely on Dartmoor's granite heights, and copper in the areas around it. It was exported from Mount Batten in prehistoric times. The Dartmoor tin-mining industry thrived for hundreds of years, continuing from pre-Roman times right through to the first half of the 20th century. In the 18th century Devon Great Consols mine (near Tavistock) was believed to be the largest copper mine in the world.

Devon's tin miners enjoyed a substantial degree of independence through Devon's stannary parliament, which dates back to the 12th century. Stannary authority exceeded English law, and because this authority applied to part-time miners (e.g. tin streamers) as well as full-time miners the stannary parliament had significant power. Until the early 18th century the stannary parliament met in an open air parliament at Crockern Tor on Dartmoor with stannators appointed to it from each of the four stannary towns. The parliament maintained its own gaol at Lydford and had a brutal and 'bloody' reputation (indeed Lydford law became a byword for injustice), and once even gaoled an English MP in the reign of Henry VIII.

Tin and tungsten have most recently been mined at Hemerdon Ball (near Plymouth). During World War 2 the mine was operated to ensure a domestic supply of both metals. The mine has periodically re-opened since then and is currently known as Hemerdon Mine.

== See also ==
- Devon
- History of Plymouth
- List of places in Devon
- List of SSSIs in Devon
- History of England
- List of lost settlements in the United Kingdom § Devon
