= Battle of Woden's Burg =

Battle of Woden's Burg may refer to:

- Battle of Woden's Burg (592)
- Battle of Woden's Burg (715)
