= Petroc =

Petroc may refer to:

- Petroc (college), a college in Devon, England
- Saint Petroc, 6th century Celtic Christian saint
- Petroc Baladrddellt, 7th century Dumnonian king
- Petroc Trelawny, 21st century Cornish broadcaster

== See also ==
- Pet Rock, a novelty toy popular in the 1970s
