= Cenberht =

- King of the West Saxons
- Died: 661
- Issue: Cædwalla of Wessex; Mul of Kent
- House: Wessex
- Father: Cedda

Cenberht (Old English: Cēnberht, Cœ̅nberht) (died c. 661) was a king in the lands of the West Saxons.

Cenberht was said to be the son of Cedda (or Cadda), about whom nothing is recorded, and the grandson of Cutha. It is thought that Cutha is the same person as Cuthwine, also found in West Saxon genealogies. He was thus, according to later genealogies, a third cousin of King Cenwalh of Wessex. The later King Caedwalla and his brother Mul were said to be sons of Cenberht.

The Anglo-Saxon Chronicle for the year 661 reports that both Cuthred, son of King Cwichelm, and Cenberht died in that year. This is the sole report of Cenberht in an early source, but based on the pattern of shared rulership among the West Saxons in this period, it is presumed that Cenberht shared power with Cenwalh in a junior role, either as a junior king or as sub-king of some part of Wessex.

== See also ==
- House of Wessex family tree
