= Ōtomo no Koteko =

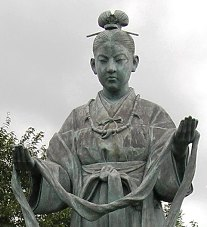
- Spouse: Emperor Sushun
- Issue: Prince Hachiko; Princess Nishikite
- House: Yamato

Ōtomo no Koteko (大伴 小手子), also known as Otehime (小手姫), was a consort of Emperor Sushun, the 32nd Emperor of Japan who reigned from 587 to 592.

Koteko was the mother of Sushun's only recorded son (Prince Hachiko) and daughter (Princess Nishikite).

According to the Nihongi, Koteko participated indirectly in her husband's assassination.

"The Imperial concubine Ohotomo no Koteko, incensed at her declining favour, sent a man to Soga no Mumako no Sukune with a message, saying:— "Recently a wild boar was presented to the Emperor. He pointed to it and said :—'When shall the man We think of be cut off as this wild boar's throat has been cut?' Besides weapons are being made in abundance in the Palace." Now Mumako no Sukune, hearing this, was alarmed."

The details of this historical narrative are incoherent without more specific information. Historians tend to question or to discredit this alleged incident in the traditional narrative because it seems incongruent with what else is known about the Imperial Court in the year of Sushun's death.
