= Siege of Exeter (c. 630) =

Legendary 7th-century battle in Brythonic chronicles

Coordinates: 50°43′21″N 3°31′57″W

| Date | c. 630 |
| Location | Caer-Uisc (Exeter) |
| Result | Truce |

Belligerents
| Britons | Mercia |

Commanders and leaders
| King Cadwallon | King Penda |

Casualties and losses
| Unknown | Unknown |

According to some early medieval sources, the siege of Exeter or siege of Caer-Uisc was a military conflict that took place in or around 630 CE, between the Mercians, led by Penda of Mercia, and the Britons occupying Caer-Uisc (Exeter) in the kingdom of Dumnonia. Penda is said to have laid siege to the town until the exiled British High King Cadwallon of Gwynedd arrived to confront him. An alliance between British and Mercian forces followed, secured by Cadwallon's marriage to Alcfrith, Penda's sister, and they marched north to face the armies of Northumbria (who were occupying Gwynedd) at the Battle of Cefn Digoll.

The Flores Historiarum (mistakenly attributed to Matthew of Westminster) recalls that the Britons were still in possession of Exeter in 632, when it was bravely defended against Penda of Mercia until relieved by Cadwallon, who engaged and defeated the Mercians with great slaughter. Geoffrey of Monmouth also paints a colourful account of the siege in his pseudo-historic Historia Regum Britanniae, saying Cadwallon made an alliance with the British nobility.

Since the 19th century, historians have expressed doubts about the existence of this conflict. For instance in 1861, George Oliver wrote:

If, in the silence of the Saxon Chronicle, we may believe Matthew of Westminster in his 'Flores Historiarum', we must state that about this time Exeter was besieged by Penda...

and in 1887 Edward Augustus Freeman could say:

There is indeed a wild tale of Geoffrey of Monmouth, repeated by some English chroniclers, which seems to be the Vespasian legend repeated with fresh names. The heathen Penda besieges Exeter in the year 634, and the siege is raised by the Briton Cadwalla. If this story is worth anything, it simply points to Caerwisc as being still a British city in the second quarter of the seventh century.
