= Dumnonia =

Historic kingdom in Sub-Roman Britain

Geography
- Capital: Isca Dumnoniorum (Exeter) (before c. 400); Tintagel
- Location: Devon and Cornwall, and parts of Somerset and Dorset
- Rulers: Kings of Dumnonia

Dumnonia (Ancient Greek: Δαμνόνιον, romanized: Damnónion, in the adjective form), a Latinised name, was a Brythonic kingdom that existed in Sub-Roman Britain between the 6th century CE and the 7th century CE in the more westerly parts of present-day South West England.

Its predecessor, the pre-Roman Dumnonii territory, was centred in the area of modern Devon, but also included modern Cornwall and part of Somerset; its eastern boundary was moved westward over time with the gradual expansion of the neighbouring Anglo-Saxon kingdom of Wessex. The spelling Damnonia is sometimes encountered, but that spelling is also used for the land of the Damnonii, later part of the Kingdom of Strathclyde, in present-day southern Scotland. The form Domnonia also occurs. The name of the kingdom shares a linguistic relationship with the Breton region of Domnonée (Breton: Domnonea).

== Name ==
The kingdom is named after the Dumnonii, a British Celtic tribe living in the southwest at the time of the Roman invasion of Britain, according to Ptolemy's Geography. Variants of the name Dumnonia include Domnonia and Damnonia, the latter being used by Gildas in the 6th century as a pun on "damnation" to deprecate the area's contemporary ruler Constantine. The name etymologically originates from Proto-Celtic *dubno- '(adjective) deep; (noun) world'.

Groups with similar names existed in Scotland (Damnonii) and Ireland (Fir Domnann). Later, the area became known to the English of neighbouring Wessex as the kingdom of West Wales, and its inhabitants were also known to them as Defnas (i.e. men of Dumnonia). In Welsh, and similarly in the Southwestern Brythonic languages, it was Dyfneint and this is the form which survives today in the name of the county of Devon (Modern Welsh: Dyfnaint, Cornish: Dewnans, Breton: Devnent).

There is evidence, based on an entry in the Ravenna Cosmography, that there may have been a sub-tribe in the western part of the territory known as the Cornovii from whose name the first element of the present-day name of Cornwall is probably derived.

Following a period of emigration from southwestern Britain to northwestern Gaul (Armorica) in the 5th and 6th centuries, a sister kingdom (Domnonée in modern French), was established on the north-facing Atlantic coast of the continent in the region that was to become known as Brittany. Historian Barbara Yorke has speculated that the Dumnonii may have seen the end of the Roman empire as an opportunity to establish control in new areas. Before the arrival of the Romans, the Dumnonii seem to have inhabited the southwest peninsula of Britain as far east as the River Parrett in Somerset and the River Axe in Dorset, judging by the coin distributions of the Dobunni and Durotriges. In the Roman period there was a provincial boundary between the area governed from Exeter and those governed from Dorchester and Ilchester. Julius Caesar's Commentarii de Bello Gallico, Book III notes the close trading and military relationship between the continental Veneti of Armorica and the southwestern insular British.

In the post-Roman period the kingdom of Dumnonia covered Cornwall, Devon and parts of west Somerset. It had close cultural and religious links with Brittany, Wales and Ireland.

In Ptolemy's Geography, originally written in Ancient Greek but only preserved in Medieval Greek manuscripts, he records four towns belonging to the Δουμνόνιοι (Doumnónioi):

- Οὐολίβα: woliva or woliba (assuming ⟨Οὐ⟩ to represent the semivocalic voiced labial–velar approximant [w]. ⟨β⟩ may represent the voiced biblabial plosive [b] or the voiced bilabial fricative [β] depenting on stage of spirantisation; see ancient greek phonology).
- Οὔξελλα: Oúxella
- Ταμάρη: Tamáre or Tamári (see iotacism)
- Ἴσκα: Íska

== Culture and industries ==
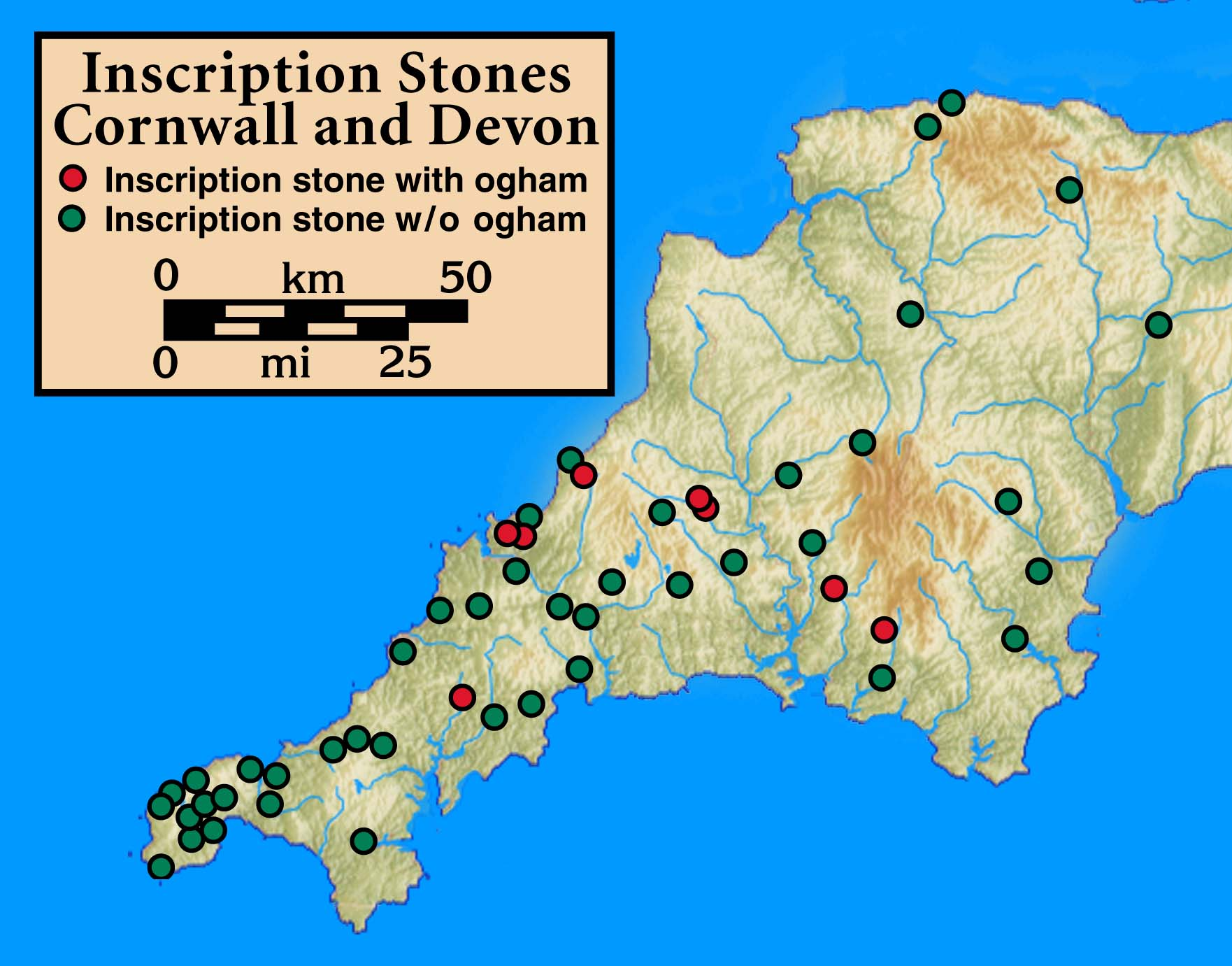
Map of inscription stones in Devon and Cornwall

The cultural connections of the pre-Roman Dumnonii, as expressed in their ceramics, are thought to have been with the peninsula of Armorica across the Channel, and with Wales and Ireland, rather than with the south-east of Britain. The people of Dumnonia would have spoken a Brythonic dialect, the ancestor of modern Cornish and Breton. Irish immigrants, the Déisi, are evidenced by the inscribed stones they have left behind—sometimes written in Ogham, sometimes in Latin, sometimes in both, confirmed and supplemented by place-name studies.

Apart from fishing and agriculture, the main economic resource of the Dumnonii was tin mining, the tin having been exported since ancient times from the port of Ictis (St Michael's Mount or Mount Batten). Tin working continued throughout Roman occupation and appears to have reached a peak during the 3rd century CE. The area maintained trade links with Gaul and the Mediterranean after the Roman withdrawal, and it is likely that tin played an important part in this trade. Post-Roman imported pottery has been excavated from many sites across the region. An apparent surge in late-5th-century Mediterranean imports is thought to be related to the trade in metals from Cornwall and Wales to the Byzantine Empire.

Christianity seems to have survived in Dumnonia after the Roman departure from Britain, with a number of late Roman Christian cemeteries extending into the post-Roman period. In the 5th and 6th centuries the area was allegedly evangelised by the children of Brychan and saints from Ireland, like Saint Piran; and Wales, like Saint Petroc or Saint Keyne. There were important monasteries at Bodmin and Glastonbury; and also Exeter where 5th-century burials discovered near the cathedral probably represent the cemetery of the foundation attended by Saint Boniface (although whether this was Saxon or Brythonic is somewhat controversial). Sporadically, Cornish bishops are named in various records until they submitted to the See of Canterbury in the mid-9th century. Parish organisation was a later development of fully Normanised times.

== Settlements ==
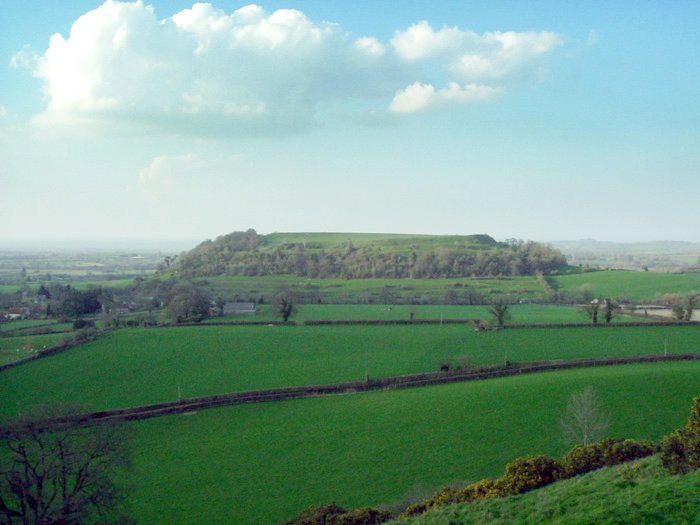
Cadbury Castle, Somerset, a possible early Dumnonian defensive site

Around 55 CE, the Romans established a legionary fortress at Isca Dumnoniorum, modern Exeter, but west of Exeter the area remained largely un-Romanised. Most of Dumnonia is notable for its lack of a villa system (Note: There are just four known villas west of the Parrett–Axe boundary, three in East Devon and an isolated and atypical one at Magor in the far west of Cornwall.) – though there were substantial numbers south of Bath and around Ilchester –, and for its many settlements that have survived from the Romano-British period. As in other Brythonic areas, Iron Age hillforts, such as Hembury and Cadbury Castle, were refortified in post-Roman times for the use of chieftains or kings, and other high-status settlements such as Tintagel seem to have been reconstructed during the period. Local archaeology has revealed that the isolated enclosed farmsteads known locally as rounds seem to have survived the Roman departure from Britain; but they were subsequently replaced, in the 6th and 7th centuries, by unenclosed farms taking the Brythonic toponymic tre(f)-.

Exeter, called Caer Uisc in Brythonic, was later the site of an important Saxon minster, but was still partially inhabited by Dumnonian Britons until the 10th century when Æthelstan expelled them. By the mid-9th century, the royal seat may have been relocated further west, during the West Saxon advance, to Lis-Cerruyt (modern Liskeard). Cornish earls in the 10th century were said to have moved to Lostwithiel after Liskeard was seized. It has been suggested that the rulers of Dumnonia were itinerant, stopping at various royal residences, such as Tintagel and Cadbury Castle, at different times of the year, and possibly simultaneously holding lands in Brittany across the Channel. There is textual and archaeological evidence that districts such as Trigg were used as marshalling points for "war hosts" from across the region.

== History and rulers ==
Although subjugated by about 78 CE, the local population could have retained strong local control, and Dumnonia may have been self-governed under Roman rule. Geoffrey of Monmouth stated that the ruler of Dumnonia, perhaps about the period c. 290 – c. 305, was Caradocus. If not an entirely legendary figure, Caradocus would not have been a king in the true sense but may have held a powerful office within the Roman administration.

The post-Roman history of Dumnonia comes from a variety of sources and is considered exceedingly difficult to interpret given that historical fact, legend and confused pseudo-history are compounded by a variety of sources in Middle Welsh and Latin. The main sources available for discussion of this period include Gildas's De Excidio Britanniae and Nennius's Historia Brittonum, the Annales Cambriae, Anglo-Saxon Chronicle, William of Malmesbury's Gesta Regum Anglorum and De Antiquitate Glastoniensis Ecclesiae, along with texts from the Black Book of Carmarthen and the Red Book of Hergest, and Bede's Historia ecclesiastica gentis Anglorum as well as "The Descent of the Men of the North" (Bonedd Gwŷr y Gogledd, in Peniarth MS 45 and elsewhere) and the Book of Baglan.

=== Conflict with the Saxons ===
In 577 Ceawlin of Wessex's victory at the Battle of Deorham caused the Britons of Dumnonia to be cut off by land from their Welsh allies, but since sea travel was not difficult this may not have been a severe loss. Clemen is thought to have been king when the Britons fought the Battle of Beandun in 614. This is most likely to have been at Bindon near Axmouth in Devon. Bampton, Oxfordshire has also been proposed as the site, but the claim lacks evidence.

According to the Flores Historiarum, attributed incorrectly to Matthew of Westminster, the Britons were still in possession of Exeter in 632, when it was bravely defended against Penda of Mercia until relieved by Cadwallon, who engaged and, according to Geoffrey of Monmouth, defeated the Mercians with "great slaughter to their troops". However, since the late 19th century this siege has not been considered a historical fact.

Around 652 Cenwalh of Wessex made a breakthrough against the Dumnonian defensive lines at the battle of Bradford-upon-Avon. The West Saxon victory at the Battle of Peonnum (possibly modern Penselwood in east Somerset), around 658, resulted in the Saxons capturing "as far as the Parrett" and the eastern part of Dumnonia being permanently annexed by Wessex.

The entry for 661 in Æthelweard's translation of the Anglo-Saxon Chronicle into Latin, known as the Chronicon Æthelweardi, describes Cenwalh of Wessex fighting a battle at Posentesburh. Though it appears from the context that this is a battle against Wulfhere of Mercia (which he may have lost), if Posentesburh is identified with Posbury, near Crediton, Devon, then it suggests conflict with the Britons. In Willibald's Life of Saint Boniface the head of Examchester monastery, which can be identified with Exeter, Devon, has a Germanic name (Wulfhard) during the time Boniface studied there. Boniface self-identifies as Anglo-Saxon by birth (using Anglorum in his letter to the English people) and therefore Exeter may have been under West Saxon control at this time, that is, the late 7th century. At this time Dumnonia was sufficiently part of the known world for Aldhelm, later bishop of Sherborne, to address a letter around 705, to its king Geraint regarding the date of Easter. In 682 Wessex forces "advanced as far as the sea", but it is unclear where this was. In 705 a bishopric was set up in Sherborne for the Saxon area west of Selwood.

In 710 Geraint was defeated in battle by King Ine of Wessex, but in 722 the Annales Cambriae claim a victory by the British in Cornwall at Hehil. By about 755, the territory of the "Defnas" was coming under significant pressure from the Saxon army. The campaigns of Egbert of Wessex in Devon between 813 and 822 probably signalled the conquest of insular Dumnonia leaving a rump state in what is today called Cornwall, known at the time as Cerniu, Cernyw, or Kernow, and to the Anglo-Saxons as Cornwall or "West Wales".

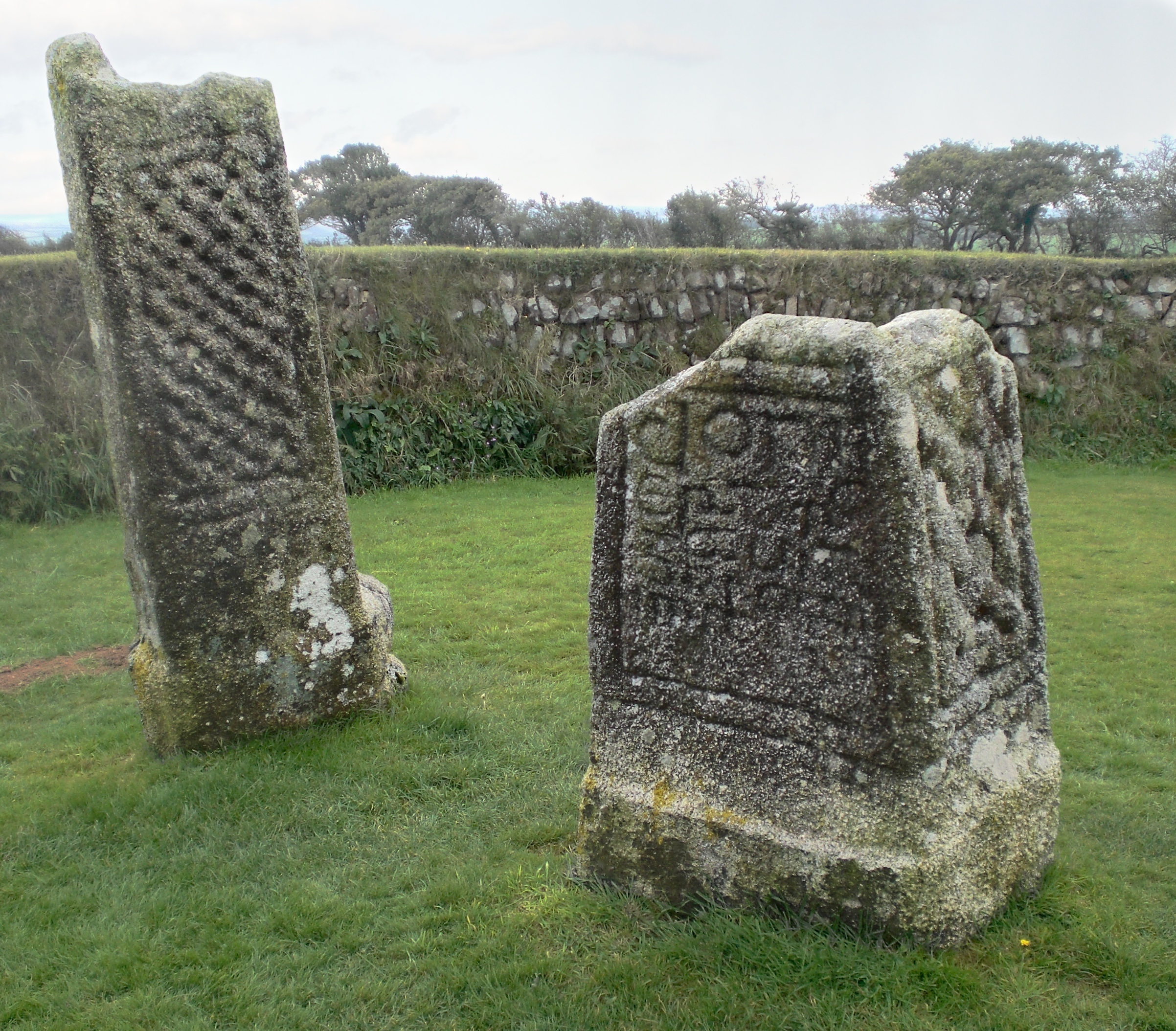
King Doniert's Stone in Cornwall, believed to commemorate Donyarth, the last recorded king of the rump state of Dumnonia

In 825 a battle was fought between the "Welsh", presumably those of Dumnonia, and the Anglo-Saxons. The Anglo-Saxon Chronicle states: "We fought the Wealas (Cornish) and the Defnas (Devonians) at Gafulforda" (perhaps Galford in west Devon). However, there is no mention of who won or who lost. A further rebellion in 838, when the "West Welsh" were supported by Danish forces, was crushed by Egbert at the battle of Hingston Down.

The Cornish bishop of Bodmin acknowledged the authority of Canterbury in 870 and the last-known Cornish king, Donyarth, died in 875. By the 880s Wessex had gained control of at least part of Cornwall, where Alfred the Great had estates. In about 936, according to William of Malmesbury writing around 1120, Athelstan evicted the Britons from Exeter and the rest of Devon, and set the east bank of the River Tamar as Cornwall's border.

Although the chronology of Wessex expansion into all of Dumnonia is unclear, Devon had long been absorbed into England by the reign of Edward the Confessor. The early-12th-century Gesta Herewardi gives the King of Cornwall just before the Norman Conquest as a man named Alef.

=== Dumnonian continuity in Cornwall and Brittany ===
Two waves of migrations took place to Armorica (Brittany) from Dumnonia. Some histories propose the theory that this may have resulted in rulers who exercised kingship in both Brittany and Dumnonia, explaining those occurrences of the same names of rulers in both territories. There are also numerous correspondences of Insular Celtic saints, and place names and a close linguistic relationship between Cornish (Kernowek) and Breton (Brezhoneg). However, the Breton regions of Kernev/Cornouaille (Cornwall) and Domnonée (Devon) have well-established histories including entirely separate rulers from Dumnonia in Britain (see Duchy of Brittany).

While Cornwall retained its language and culture, Devon's had significantly diminished by the arrival of the Saxon invaders in the 7th century, almost entirely due to the large-scale migration of Britons from greater Dumnonia to Armorica at the end of the Roman occupation. J.B. Gover (Note: John Eric Bruce Gover (1894–1984), English scholar.) wrote in 1931 that

by the middle of the seventh century Devon was a sparsely settled Celtic kingdom due to large-scale emigration to Armorica a century and more earlier, and that once the resistance of its kings had been broken down no considerable native population remained to complicate the life of the new settlers.

The relationship between the new Saxon overlords and the remaining indigenous Britons appears to have been peaceable and many Celtic place-names survive in the county, although not to the extent of that of the neighbouring sub-tribe, the Cornovii, who became modern-day Cornwall.

The pre-medieval region of Cornouaille (Breton: Kernev) in the Brittany region of the Armorican peninsula is assumed to owe its name to descendants originating in insular Cornwall. (Note: The folklore of the association between the regions, kingdoms, and duchies of Cornwall and Brittany includes the figure Mark of Cornwall, whose territory included lands in both this region of the British Isles and Brittany on the continent, as portrayed in the 12th-century romance Tristan and Iseult.) The territories of the ancient Cornouaille region coincide mostly with the southern part of the French departement of the Finistère, (Note: Finisterre is French for "Land's End.") and some of its territorial lands are included in the departements of Côtes d'Armor and Morbihan. At least part of the original territory associated with the pre-medieval Breton kingdom of Domnonea, coincides with the modern French department of Côtes-d'Armor. (Note: It is unlikely that the British realms of Cornwall and the continental realms in the Brittany region were continuous in government. In the post-Roman period, tribes from Britain migrated to Brittany and mixed with tribes already in the Armorican peninsula. As a result of these migrations, the Brittany region contained two separate geographic areas known as Dumnonée and Cornouaille. By the early 10th century these Breton regions were consolidated into the Duchy of Brittany and the continuity with Dumnonia at the governmental level ended, while the historical and cultural continuity remains through modern times.)

There is debate about the location of Arthur's supposed great victory at the Battle of Mount Badon, where the Britons fought off Anglo-Saxons. Most historians believe this battle, if it was historical, was fought outside the territory, at Bath, for instance. Geoffrey of Monmouth claimed that Arthur's final Battle of Camlann was fought in Cornwall: tradition points to Slaughterbridge, near Camelford, which itself has been claimed, without foundation, to be the location of Camelot.

== See also ==
- List of legendary rulers of Cornwall, for the pseudo-historic kings and dukes of Cornwall mentioned by Geoffrey of Monmouth
- History of Devon
- History of Cornwall
- History of Brittany

== Sources ==
- Payton, Philip (2004). Cornwall: A History (2nd ed.). Fowey: Cornwall Editions Ltd. ISBN 1-904880-00-2.
- Pearce, Susan M. (1978). The Kingdom of Dumnonia: Studies in History and Tradition in South-Western Britain A.D. 350–1150. Padstow: Lodenek Press. ISBN 0-902899-68-6.
- Thomas, Charles (1994). And Shall These Mute Stones Speak? Post-Roman Inscriptions in Western Britain. Cardiff: University of Wales Press. ISBN 0-7083-1160-1.
- Yorke, Barbara (1995). "Period of Transition". Wessex in the early Middle Ages. Continuum International Publishing Group. pp. 15–19. ISBN 0-7185-1856-X.
