= Prince Hachiko =

Japanese prince (542–641)

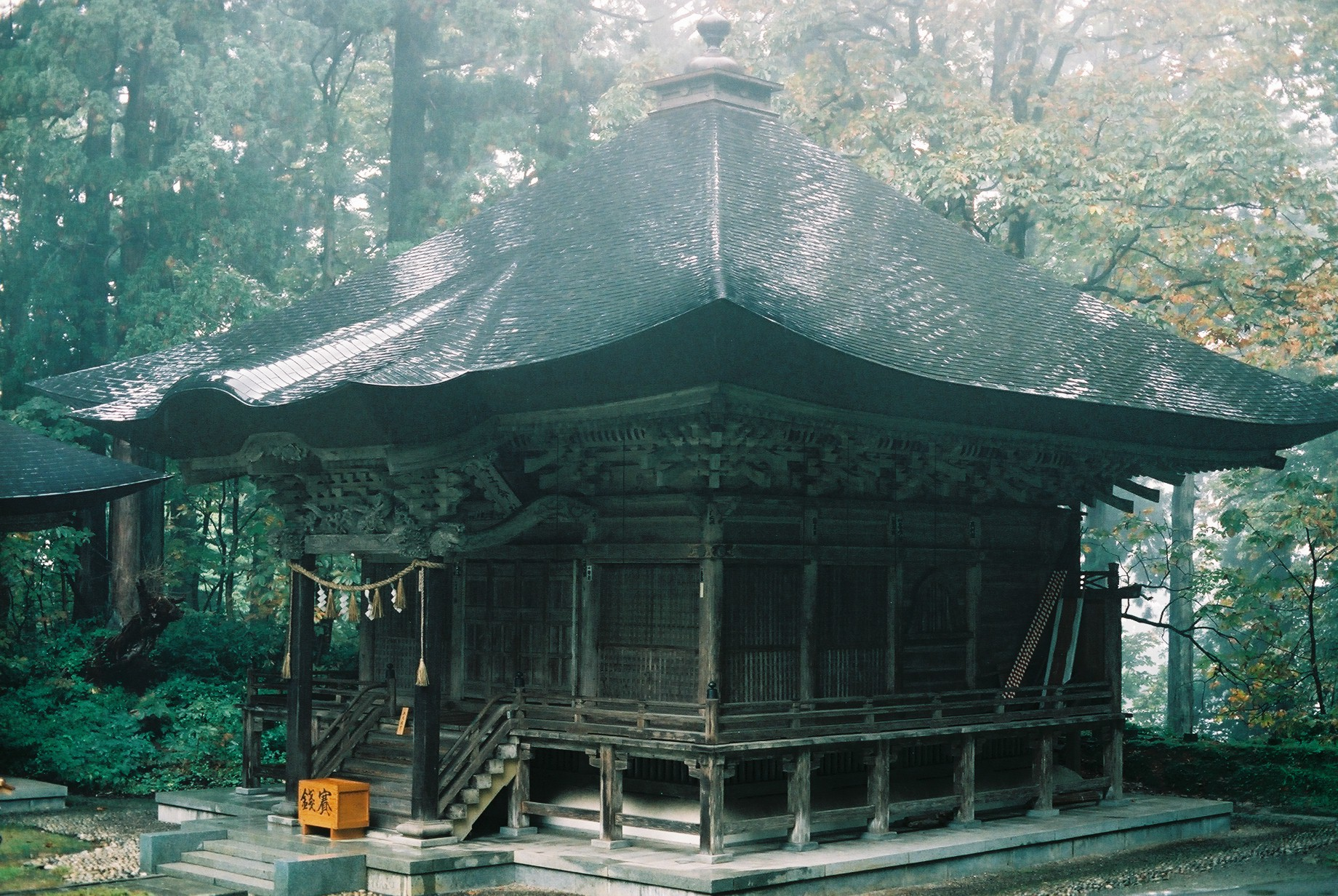
Hachiko Shrine at Dewa Sanzan

Prince Hachiko (蜂子皇子, Hachiko no Ōji; 542–641) was the eldest son of Emperor Sushun, the 32nd Emperor of Japan who reigned from 587 to 592. His mother was Ōtomo no Koteko, Sushun's consort.

After the assassination of his father in 592, Hachiko was forced to flee the Soga clan. He made his way north along the western seacoast of Honshū. He came ashore in Dewa Province, where he invested the rest of his life in religious pursuits.

Prince Hachiko is traditionally venerated at an imperial tomb on the top of Mt. Haguro in Tsuruoka. The Imperial Household Agency designates this location at Dewa Sanzan as Hachiko Shrine (蜂子神社, Hachiko-jinja). The tomb was guarded by Imperial soldiers up until the end of World War II.
