= Petroc Baladrddellt =

- King of Dumnonia
- Reign: c. 630 - c. 652
- Predecessor: Clemen ap Bledric
- Born: c. 600
- Died: c. 652; Bradford-on-Avon
- Issue: Culmin; Progmael
- Father: Clemen ap Bledric

Petroc Baladrddellt (also known as Pedrog, or Pedrogl Paladrddellt) was a 7th-century King of Dumnonia (now the English West Country).

== Monarch ==
According to the Welsh pedigrees in the Bonedd y Saint or "Genealogies of the Saints", Petroc Baladrddellt ap Clemen was the son of Clemen (or Clement) ap Bledrig, his epithet meaning "Splintered Spear". It is thought he was born in c. 600 and succeeded to the Dumnonian throne after his father in c. 630, reigning at a time of continued West Saxon aggression which had also affected his father. His death may have occurred in c. 652 when King Cenwalh of Wessex is said to have defeated the Britons at the battle of Bradford-on-Avon, taking large swathes of Dorset and Somerset. Other sources are unclear as to whether this battle was civil war between Cenwalh and his kinsman Cuthred, or against the Welsh or the Mercians or both.

== Family ==
King Petroc may have had two sons, Culmin (or Cwlfyn) and Progmael (or Brochwel). In the later case, Culmin is given as the son of Progmael and grandson of Petroc, as given in the Book of Baglan. If so, Prince Progmael appeared to have predeceased his father Clemen ap Bledric who died in c.654, at Y Ferwig in Ceredigion, leaving the Dumnonian kingdom to Culmin.

== In Welsh literature ==
In the late medieval Welsh list of triads, Pedwar Marchog ar Hugain Llys Arthur ("The 24 Knights of King Arthur's Court"), Petroc is given as one of the three Marchawg Cyviawnbwyll or 'Just Knights of Britain' in Arthur’s court as Pedrog Splintered-Spear, son of Clement Prince of Cornwall. With Blaes son of the Earl of Llychlyn, and Cadog son of Gwynlliw the Bearded, he was described as slaying whoever did wrong to the weak, no matter how strong they might be, and the three had themselves to preserve justice by every Law. Pedrog’s was by Law of arms.

Petroc himself would have lived much later than King Arthur; however, his namesake St Petroc, with whom he is often confused, was described as one of the seven survivors of the Battle of Camlann according to Evan Evans’ copy (Panton MS 13) of the 17th-century Peniarth 185 manuscript.

In his Biographical Dictionary of Eminent Welshmen, Williams asserts that Petroc (Pedrogl Paladrddellt) is better known as the English translation of the name Lancelot du Lac of Arthurian Legend.
