= Ceolwald of Wessex =

Ceolwald of Wessex was a member of the House of Wessex (see House of Wessex family tree). Although a member of the direct male line from Cynric to Egbert, Ceolwald was never king.

His father was Cuthwulf of Wessex (592–622) and himself was the father of Ceonred of Wessex (644–698).
