= Battle of Woden's Burg (715) =

Coordinates: 51.3556°N 1.8372°W

Battle of Woden's Burg (715) naberlan
Date	715
Location	Adam's Grave, Wiltshire
Result	Unknown

Belligerents
West Saxons	Unknown

The Anglo-Saxon Chronicle records a battle fought in the year 715 at Woden's Burg, the Neolithic long barrow now known as Adam's Grave, near Marlborough, Wiltshire. The entry states: "Her Ine 7 Ceolred fuhton æt Woddes beorge." (There Ine and Ceolred fought at Woden's hill.)

Ine was king of Anglo-Saxon Wessex and Ceolred was king of Anglo-Saxon Mercia. The identity of the opposing force is not recorded.

The Anglo-Saxon Chronicle also records an earlier battle on the same site. The area was of strategic importance since it lay near the intersection of the ancient Ridgeway with Wansdyke.
