= Adam's Grave =

Neolithic long barrow in England

Coordinates: 51°22′10″N 1°50′24″W

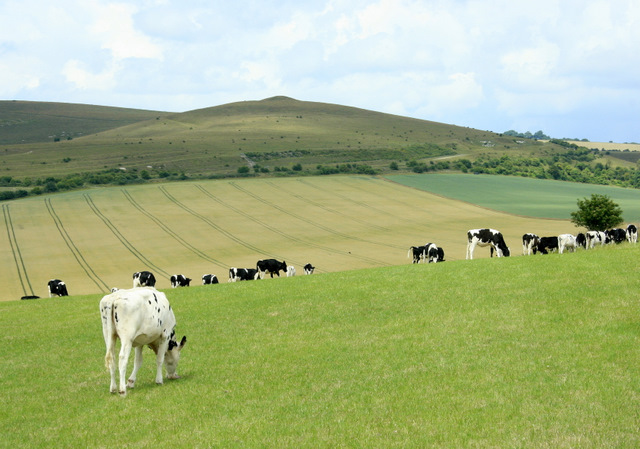
Cattle on the side of Woodborough Hill, with Adam's Grave and Walkers Hill on the skyline

Adam's Grave was a Neolithic long barrow near Alton Barnes in Wiltshire, southwest England. Its remains have been scheduled as an ancient monument.

The barrow is considered to be of the Severn-Cotswold tomb type. These generally consist of long, precisely built trapezoidal earth mounds covering burial chambers, thus they are a type of chambered long barrow. The chamber, made of sarsen stones, contained partial human skeletons. An arrowhead was also recovered. There is a breast-shaped hill on the spot, with the remains of the barrow being 70 metres (230 ft) long and around 7 metres (23 ft) high with ditches on either side. It was partially excavated by John Thurnam in 1860. The area around Adam's Grave has a high density of long barrows and is important because of its archaeological potential.

The arrangement of stones around the site suggests there was once a kerb or forecourt. They are known as 'Old Adam' and 'Little Eve' and are near the original entrance to the barrow. According to folklore the barrow is the grave of a giant, and his ghost has been reported. Associations with the nearby monument at Avebury have also been suggested.

In the Anglo-Saxon period, the site was known as "Woden's Barrow" (Old English "Wōdnesbeorg") and the Anglo-Saxon Chronicle records two battles, in 592 and 715, thought to have taken place at the site.
