= Cuthwine of Wessex =

West Saxon prince (b.565)

Cuthwine
- Born: 565
- Issue: Cynebald; Cedda; Cuthwulf (son of Cuthwine)
- House: Wessex
- Father: Ceawlin of Wessex

Cuthwine (born c. 565), was a member of the House of Wessex, the son of King Ceawlin of Wessex. Cuthwine's father Ceawlin was deposed from the throne of Wessex in 592 by his nephew Ceol. Therefore, Cuthwine never inherited the throne. Cuthwine went into exile for many decades, remaining a strong leader of the Saxons and passing on the royal line through his three sons.

== Early life ==
He was born in the fifth year of his father's long reign over the West Saxons. He was a grandson of Cynric, the son of Cerdic, the first of the Saxons to come across the sea from Germany; and he and his people were still relatively out of place in a world dominated by the Britons. Nothing is known of his early life.

Ceawlin lost the throne of Wessex in June 592. The annal for that year in the Anglo-Saxon Chronicle reads, at least in part: "Here there was great slaughter at Woden’s Barrow, and Ceawlin was driven out". Woden's Barrow is a tumulus, now called Adam's Grave, at Alton Priors, Wiltshire. His opponent was Ceol, the next king of Wessex, who ruled for six years. Ceawlin died in exile the following year, along with Cwichelm and Crida, his brothers and commanders of the armies in what is now Dorset and Hampshire.

The origins of the battle are unclear; it is probable that nothing more than greed and a lust for power motivated Ceol. Cuthwine, then twenty-seven, was a commander in the fateful battle; but upon defeat, as the rightful heir to the throne, he fled the place along with his family.

== Exile ==
As stated above, the following year (593) saw the deaths of his father and uncles in unclear circumstances, although likely in another battle. Cuthwine escaped from this defeat also, and went into exile to the east with his young family (see below). For the first few years at least he lived as an outlaw, although his persecution seems to have waned somewhat when Ceol was supplanted by his brother.

Ceol, described as a ruthless leader, was a son of Cutha (the brother of Ceawlin and a son of Cynric) and hence a cousin of Cuthwine; and Ceolwulf, his brother, reigned for seventeen years after him. Great fragmentation of control among the West Saxons occurred at this time: Ceol and Ceolwulf were in control of Wiltshire, as opposed to the upper Thames valley where Cuthwine and his household were almost certainly based. Other factions are believed to have existed in Devon and Gloucestershire as the house of Ceol struggled to increase their supremacy over Wessex.

If Ceol and Ceolwulf made efforts to eradicate the members of the original branch of the ruling family, they were unsuccessful. At any rate Cuthwine remained at large during this period and some sources indicate that around the year 605 Ceolwulf may have been forced into a power-sharing deal with him, his brother (with whom he had previously shared power) having been dead seven years. At any rate, Cuthwine was far from a fugitive after the first few years of his supposed exile.

In his princely years before the death of his father Cuthwine had at least three sons:

- Cynebald, born 585;
- Cedda, born 590;
- Cuthwulf, born 592.

The name of their mother is not recorded, but it is possible that she died in the tumult surrounding Cuthwine's flight into exile given that Cuthwine had no more children after that time. Cedda became the father of Coenberht, in turn the Caedwalla of Wessex and his brother Mul of Kent, both kings in later years. Through Cutha/Cuthwulf, Cuthwine's youngest son, were ultimately descended the Kings of Wessex after the line of Ceol became extinct in 685.

== Later life ==
He lived a long life, remaining in a powerful position throughout the reign of Cynegils son of Ceol; and then Cenwalh, son of Cynegils, became king. In the year 645 Penda of Mercia overran the kingdom (in return for Cenwalh's repudiation of Penda's sister) and was for three years king, sending Cenwalh into exile in East Anglia. Cuthwine is recorded as having been present at the negotiations along with his sons, but little more is known of his activities. Nevertheless, much can be deduced. If this experienced prince was not the sole ruler of Wessex during the years of Cenwalh's exile (naturally in a subservient position to Penda) then it is likely that he was a member of the ruling body; but, given the tangled diplomacy of the times and his eastern power base, it is equally likely that he aided Cenwalh in his successful attempt to regain the throne in 648.

After this, he appears infrequently as a shadowy figure, apparently already passing into legend among the common people as a result of his long-held position against the (at times) brutal role of Ceol and his family. There is reason to suggest that he was already dead by this time; at any rate he would have been past eighty by the beginning of Cenwalh's reign and it seems inconceivable that he would have lived to see the reinstatement of his line to the throne of Wessex.

This enigmatic prince and his long roster of descendants were not forgotten by the West Saxons, however. When the line of Ceol finally became extinct, first Caedwalla of Wessex and then Ine of Wessex became king; both great-grandsons of Cuthwine. Egbert of Wessex, ancestor of the later Kings of England, descends from Ine's brother and hence also from Cuthwine.

== See also ==
- House of Wessex family tree
