= Emperor Sushun =

Emperor of Japan from 587 to 592

Emperor Sushun 崇峻天皇
- Great King of Yamato
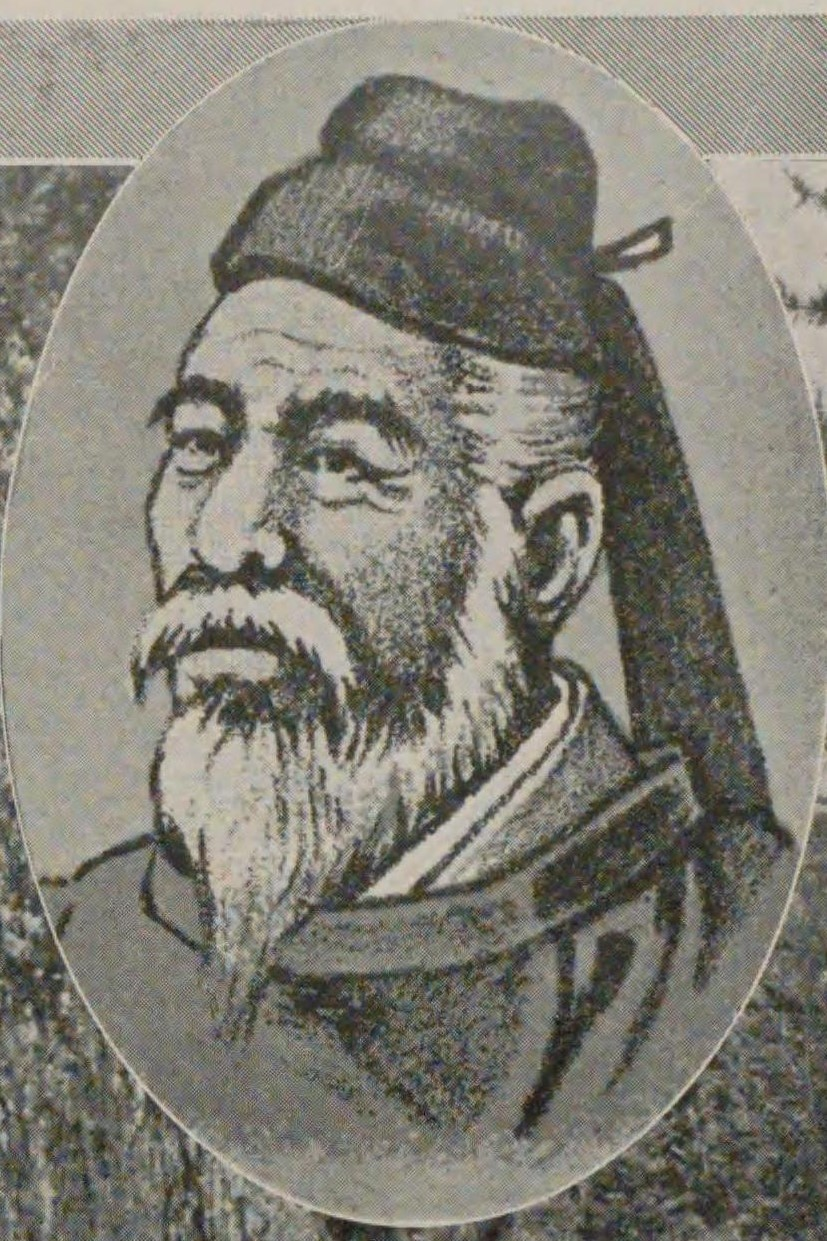

Emperor of Japan
- Reign: 9 September 587 – 12 December 592
- Predecessor: Yōmei
- Successor: Suiko
- Born: Hatsusebe (泊瀬部); 520
- Died: 592 (aged 72)
- Burial: Kurahashi no oka no e no misasagi (倉梯岡陵) (Nara)
- Spouse: Ōtomo no Koteko
- Issue among others...: Prince Sadayo; Prince Hachiko; Princess Nishikite
Posthumous name
- Chinese-style shigō: Emperor Sushun (崇峻天皇) Japanese-style shigō: Hatsusebenowakasasagi no Sumeramikoto (長谷部若雀天皇)
- House: Imperial House of Japan
- Father: Emperor Kinmei
- Mother: Hirohime
- Religion: Shinto

Emperor Sushun (崇峻天皇, Sushun-tennō; died 592) was the 32nd Emperor of Japan, according to the traditional order of succession.

Sushun's reign spanned the years from 587 through 592.

== Traditional narrative ==
Before his ascension to the Chrysanthemum Throne, his personal name (his imina) was Hatsusebe-shinnō, also known as Hatsusebe no Waka-sazaki.

His name at birth was Hatsusebe (泊瀬部). He was the twelfth son of Emperor Kinmei. His mother was Empress Hirohime (蘇我小姉君), a daughter of Soga no Iname, who was the chief, or Ōomi, of the Soga clan.

He succeeded his half-brother, Emperor Yōmei in 587, and lived in the Kurahashi Palace (Kurahashi no Miya) in Yamato.

- 587: In the 2nd year of Yōmei-tennō's reign (用明天皇2年), the Emperor died, and despite a dispute over who should follow him as sovereign, the succession was received by another son of Emperor Kinmei, one of Yōmei's younger brothers. Shortly thereafter, Emperor Sushun is said to have acceded to the throne.

Sushun's contemporary title would not have been tennō, as most historians believe this title was not introduced until the reigns of Emperor Tenmu and Empress Jitō. Rather, it was presumably Sumeramikoto or Amenoshita Shiroshimesu Ōkimi (治天下大王), meaning "the great king who rules all under heaven". Alternatively, Sushun might have been referred to as ヤマト大王/大君 or the "Great King of Yamato".

He came to the throne with the support of the Soga clan and Empress Suiko, his half sister and the widow of Emperor Bidatsu. Initially, the Mononobe clan, a rival clan of the Sogas, allied with Prince Anahobe, another son of Kimmei, and attempted to have him installed as Emperor. At the Battle of Shigisan, Soga no Umako, who succeeded his father as Ōomi of the Soga clan, eventually killed Mononobe no Moriya, the head of the Mononobe clan, which led to its decline. Umako then installed Emperor Sushun on the throne.

As time went on, Sushun eventually became resentful of Umako's power, and wanted him deposed. It is said that one day, he killed a wild boar and stated, "As I have slain this boar, so would I slay the one I despise". This angered Soga no Umako and, perhaps out of fear of being struck first, Umako hired Yamatonoaya no Koma to assassinate Sushun in 592.

Emperor Sushun's reign lasted for five years before his death at the age of 72.

The actual site of Sushun's grave is known. The Emperor is traditionally venerated at a memorial Shinto shrine (misasagi) at Nara.

The Imperial Household Agency designates this location as Yōmei's mausoleum. It is formally named Kurahashi no oka no e no misasagi.

== Genealogy ==
Sushun had two consorts and three Imperial children.

- Consort (Hi) : Koteko (小手子), Otomo-no-Nukateko's daughter
  - Third Son: Prince Hachiko (蜂子皇子)
  - Princess Nishikite (錦代皇女)
- Beauty (Hin) : Kahakami-no-Iratsume (河上娘; 575-618), Soga no Umako's daughter
- Mother Unknown
  - Imperial Prince Sadayo (定世親王), older brother of Prince Hachiko, Nakahara clan's ancestor
- Concubine: Futsuhime (布都姫), Mononobe no Moriya's younger sister

== See also ==
- Emperor of Japan
- List of Emperors of Japan
- Imperial cult

== Notes ==
Regnal titles
Preceded by Emperor Yōmei	Emperor of Japan: Sushun; 587–593	Succeeded by Empress Suiko
