= Battle of Deorham =

Supposed 577 battle between West Saxons and Britons

Coordinates: 51°29′20.76″N 2°22′25.34″W

- Part of the Anglo-Saxon settlement of Britain
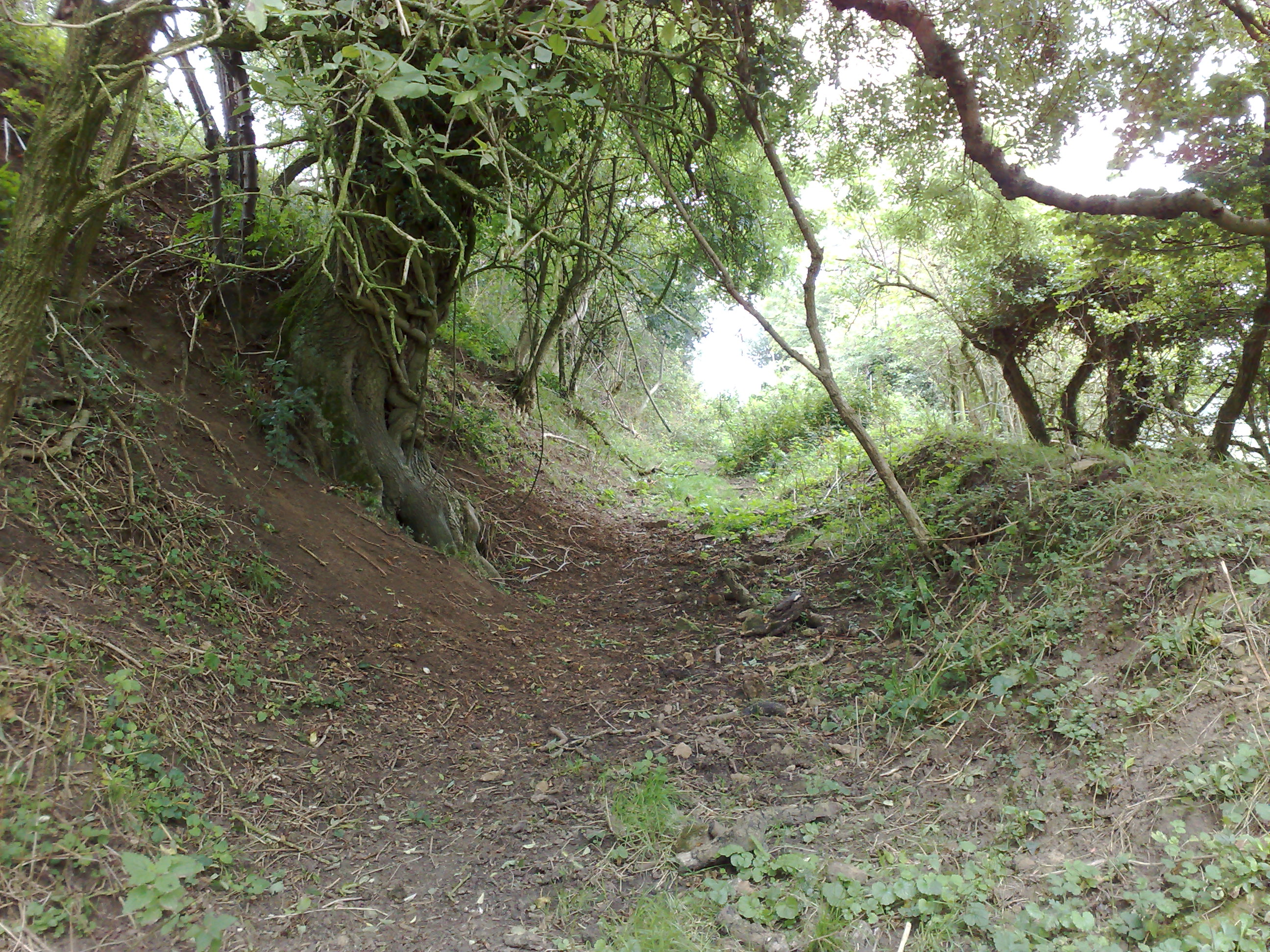
- Earthworks around Hinton Hill, just north of Dyrham, Gloucestershire
Date	577
Location	Dyrham, South Gloucestershire, England
Result	Saxon victory

Belligerents
West Saxons	Britons

Commanders and leaders
Ceawlin; Cuthwine	Conmail †; Condidan †; Farinmail †

The Battle of Deorham (or Dyrham) is portrayed by the Anglo-Saxon Chronicle as an important military encounter between the West Saxons and the Britons in the West Country in 577. The Chronicle depicts the battle as a major victory for Wessex's forces, led by Ceawlin and one Cuthwine, resulting in the capture of the Romano-British towns of Glevum (Gloucester), Corinium Dobunnorum (Cirencester), and Aquae Sulis (Bath).

== Evidence ==
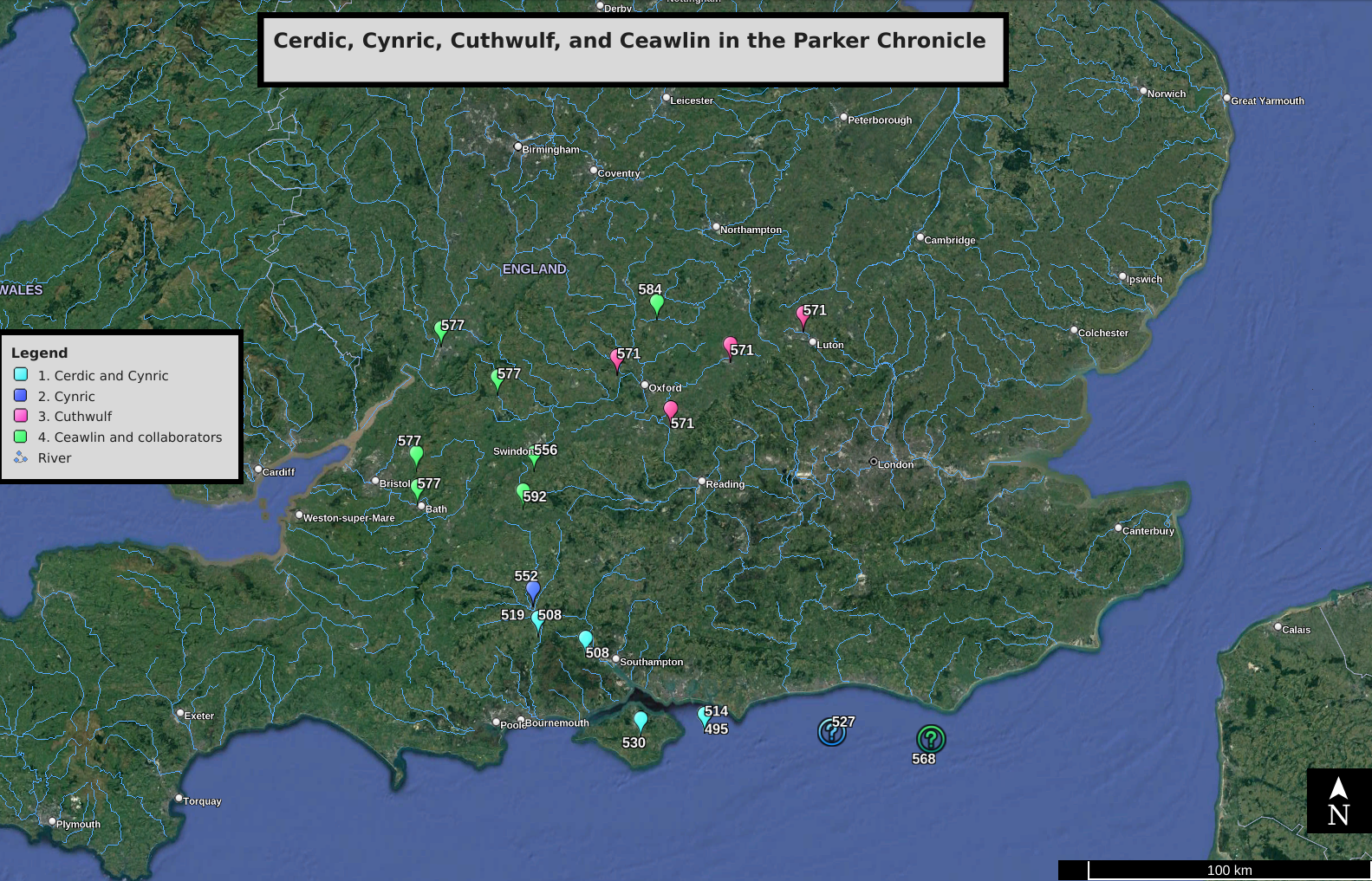
Sixth- and seventh-century battles of West-Saxon kings according to the Anglo-Saxon Chronicle

The only evidence for the battle is an entry in the Anglo-Saxon Chronicle, in the so-called 'common stock' of annals on which all manuscripts of the Chronicle build that was edited into its current form in the later ninth century. As given in the earliest manuscript, the Parker Chronicle, the annal reads:

Hēr Cuþwine ⁊ Ċeawlin fuhton wiþ Brettas, ⁊ hīe .iii. kyningas ofslōgon, Coinmail, ⁊ Condidan, ⁊ Farinmail, in þǣre stōwe þe is ġecweden Dēorham. ⁊ ġenāmon .iii. ċeastra Glēawanċeaster, ⁊ Ċirenċeaster, ⁊ Baþanċeaster.

577: Here Cuthwine and Ceawlin fought against the Britons, and they killed 3 kings, Coinmail, Condidan and Farinmail, in the place which is called Deorham, and took 3 cities: Gloucester and Cirencester and Bath.

Scholars agree that the place-name Deorham here survives in the name of Dyrham in what is now South Gloucestershire, on the Cotswolds escarpment a few miles north of Bath, and that it is here that the battle is portrayed as taking place. The identification of the other cities is even less controversial; they correspond to Corinium, a provincial capital in the Roman period (Cirencester); Glevum, a former colonia (Gloucester); and Aquae Sulis, a renowned spa and pagan religious centre (Bath).

Saint Aldate, a British bishop, is said to have been killed in the battle.

== Historiography ==
=== Nineteenth-century narrative of Anglo-Saxon settlement ===
In an influential lecture of 1849 on "The Early English Settlements in South Britain", Edwin Guest argued that the battle was (in the words of one of his audience) the culmination of

the long story of the gradual encroachments of the conquerors on the native tribes retiring step by step, only yielding up their territory after bloody defeats, the battles of Charford, and Badbury, and Barbury and Old Sarum, within a mile or two of the place of our meeting, until the decisive battle of Deorham sealed the fate of southern Britain, and the Weals [Britons], severed from one another by the broad expanse of the Severn Sea, were finally cooped up among the mountain ridges of Wales, or in the peninsula of Cornwall.

Guest's conception of the reality of the battle and its place in a coherent narrative of Anglo-Saxon military conquest and settlement of southern Britain remained prominent among historians into the 1980s, partly on the basis of the natural strategic importance of the Severn Valley in British geography. These historians include Frank Stenton, John Morris, H. P. R. Finberg, and J. N. L. Myres.

==== Twentieth-century military-history speculation ====
The belief that the Chronicle account was substantially reliable—notwithstanding its obvious brevity—encouraged elaborate speculation by antiquarians such as Welbore St Clair Baddeley. In 1929 he supposed that the Saxons launched a surprise attack and seized the hill fort at the Hinton Hill Camp (near Dyrham) because it commanded the Avon Valley, and disrupted communications north and south between Bath and the neighbouring Romano-British towns of Gloucester and Cirencester. Once the Saxons were in occupation of the site (and, he supposed, had begun reinforcing the existing Iron Age defensive structures at the site) the Britons of those three towns were compelled to unite and make a combined attempt to dislodge them. Their attempt failed and the three opposing British kings were killed. Their routed forces were driven north of the River Severn and south of Bath where it appears they began the construction of the defensive earthwork called the Wansdyke in a doomed attempt to prevent more territory from being lost.

The military historian Lieutenant-Colonel Alfred Burne, employing his theory of "inherent military probability", opted for a simpler explanation for the battle than Baddeley. In his view, Ceawlin was methodically advancing towards the Severn and the three forces of Britons concentrated to stop him. Burne suggests that they formed up along two slight ridges across the trackway that skirted the Forest of Braden, with Hinton Hill Camp behind them as their stores depot. Burne speculated that if the Saxon attack drove the Britons back from their first line onto the second ridge near the edge of the escarpment, the slightest further retreat would leave their flanks open to a downhill pursuit. He imagined that this is what occurred, with the three Briton leaders and their main body being driven back into the fort while the flanking Saxons driving forwards swept round behind the promontory on which the fort stands. A last stand in this position would explain why none of the three Briton leaders were able to escape. Burne went so far as to speculate that the battle was the starting point for Welsh and Cornish becoming two separate languages.

=== Re-evaluation ===
By the early 1980s, a new wave of source-criticism was underway regarding the fifth-to-seventh centuries in Britain, and the Battle of Deorham was prominently tackled by Patrick Sims-Williams. He noted that the Anglo-Saxon Chronicle shows no signs of being a contemporary record for the sixth century and many signs of being a later fabrication based on oral tradition and folk-etymologies of place-names, and that its material for the sixth century may reflect later West-Saxon attempts to legitimise their politics in the seventh, eighth, and/or ninth centuries by circulating stories of an imaginary past. Showing how the Chronicle's 571 Battle of Bedcanford would have functioned to provide a West-Saxon right of conquest to much of the Chiltern Hills and the vale to their north-west following Mercia's conquest of that area in the eighth century, he noted that the Battle of Deorham too might have been used by West Saxons to counter Mercian claims in the Severn Valley. But he thought more likely the possibility that the annal was based on a Welsh triad, itself unlikely to be historically accurate, arising from a similar tradition to medieval Welsh literature which places an English-battling seventh-century king called Cynddylan in the Wroxeter region.

Scholars also argued that the importance given to the towns more likely reflects ninth and tenth-century polities, of the time the Chronicle was given its present form, than the de-urbanised sixth century. In April 2022 an online interdisciplinary conference was held via Zoom intended to "to draw together experts in archaeology, history, linguistics and placenames in an attempt to better understand the late sixth-century context for this supposed battle and to critically evaluate the composition and significance of the entry in the Anglo-Saxon Chronicle."

Not all modern scholars go so far as to deny the battle happened. The medievalist Roger Collins doubted much of the traditional importance given it without denying the battle occurred. Barbara Yorke also questioned the dating of the battle without necessarily regarding it as a fictional event. Guy Halsall summarized this position by acknowledging the uncertain nature of the historical evidence for both Deorham and the earlier Battle of Bedcanford but nonetheless observing:

This does not mean that none of these sixth century battles occurred, or that they did not involve any of the personages named. Some or all of the Welsh kings named by the Chronicle (Conmail, Farinmail, and Candidan) may indeed have fought at Dyrham. We have no way of being sure, though, and it remains much more unlikely that they ruled the three cities named as falling to the West Saxons afterwards, which lie in the territory disputed by Wessex and Mercia.
