= Cedda =

Prince of Wessex

- Born: 590
- Issue: Cenberht
- House: Wessex
- Father: Cuthwine

Cedda (alternatively Cadda or Chad) was the second son of Cuthwine and consequently a member of the Wessex family. He was born c. 590 and his death date is unknown. He had one recorded son, Coenberht, the father of King Caedwalla of Wessex.

His name is related to that of St Chad of Mercia (spelt Ceadda in Bede's Ecclesiastical History) and is derived from the Brythonic (British Celtic) root 'cat' or 'cad' meaning "battle." It is one of a number of apparently Celtic names found in the West Saxon ruling family, including that of Cedda's grandson Caedwalla.

== Sources ==
- brief outline of Cedda.

- Koch, J.T., (2006) Celtic Culture: A Historical Encyclopedia, ABC-CLIO, ISBN 1-85109-440-7
