= Constantine (Briton) =

King of Dumnonia in sub-Roman Britain

Constantine (/ˈkɒnstəntiːn/, Welsh: Cystennin, fl. 520–523) was a 6th-century king of Dumnonia in sub-Roman Britain, who was remembered in later British tradition as a legendary King of Britain. The only contemporary information about him comes from Gildas, who castigated him for various sins, including the murder of two "royal youths" inside a church. The historical Constantine is also known from the genealogies of the Dumnonian kings, and possibly inspired the tradition of Saint Constantine, a king-turned-monk venerated in southwest Britain and elsewhere.

In the 12th century, Geoffrey of Monmouth included Constantine in his pseudohistorical chronicle Historia Regum Britanniae, adding details to Gildas' account and making Constantine the successor to King Arthur as King of Britain. Under Geoffrey's influence, Constantine appeared as Arthur's heir in later chronicles. Less commonly, he also appeared in that role in medieval Arthurian romances and prose works, and in some modern versions of the legend.

== History ==
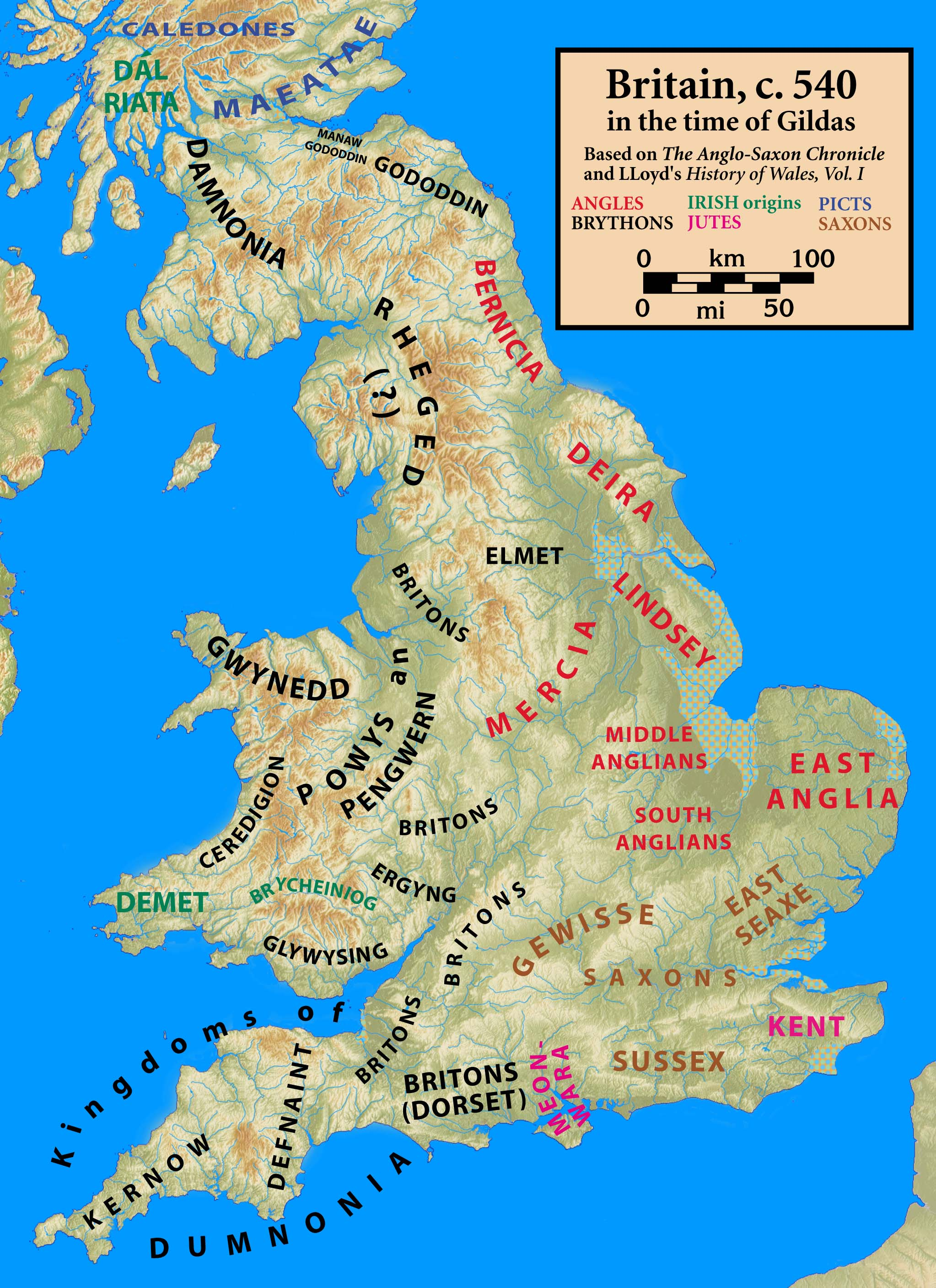
Southern Britain in c. 540, the time of Gildas. Constantine's likely kingdom of Dumnonia is in the southwest; the territory of the Damnonii is in the northwest.

The 6th-century monk Gildas mentions Constantine in chapters 28 and 29 of his De Excidio et Conquestu Britanniae. Constantine is one of five Brittonic kings whom the author rebukes and compares to Biblical beasts. Gildas calls Constantine the "tyrannical whelp of the unclean lioness of Damnonia", a reference to the books of Daniel and Revelation, and apparently also a slur directed at his mother. This Damnonia is generally identified as the kingdom of Dumnonia in present-day South West England. Scholars such as Lloyd Laing and Leslie Alcock note the possibility that Gildas may have instead intended the territory of the Damnonii, a tribe in present-day Scotland mentioned by Ptolemy in the 2nd century, but others such as Thomas D. O'Sullivan consider this unlikely.

Gildas says that despite swearing an oath against deceit and tyranny, Constantine disguised himself in an abbot's robes and attacked two "royal youths" praying before a church altar, killing them and their companions. Gildas is clear that Constantine's sins were manifold even before this, as he had committed "many adulteries" after casting off his lawfully wedded wife. Gildas encourages Constantine, whom he knows to still be alive at the time, to repent his sins lest he be damned. The murders may relate to a 6th-century cult in Brittany honoring the Saints Dredenau, two young princes killed by an ambitious uncle.

Scholars generally identify Gildas' Constantine with the figure Custennin Gorneu or Custennin Corneu (Constantine of Cornwall) who appears in the genealogies of the kings of Dumnonia. Custennin is mentioned as the father of Erbin and the grandfather of the hero Geraint in the Bonedd y Saint, the prose romance Geraint and Enid, and after emendation, the genealogies in Jesus College MS 20. Based on Custennin's placement in the genealogies, Thomas D. O'Sullivan suggests a floruit for Constantine of 520–523.

== Saint Constantine ==
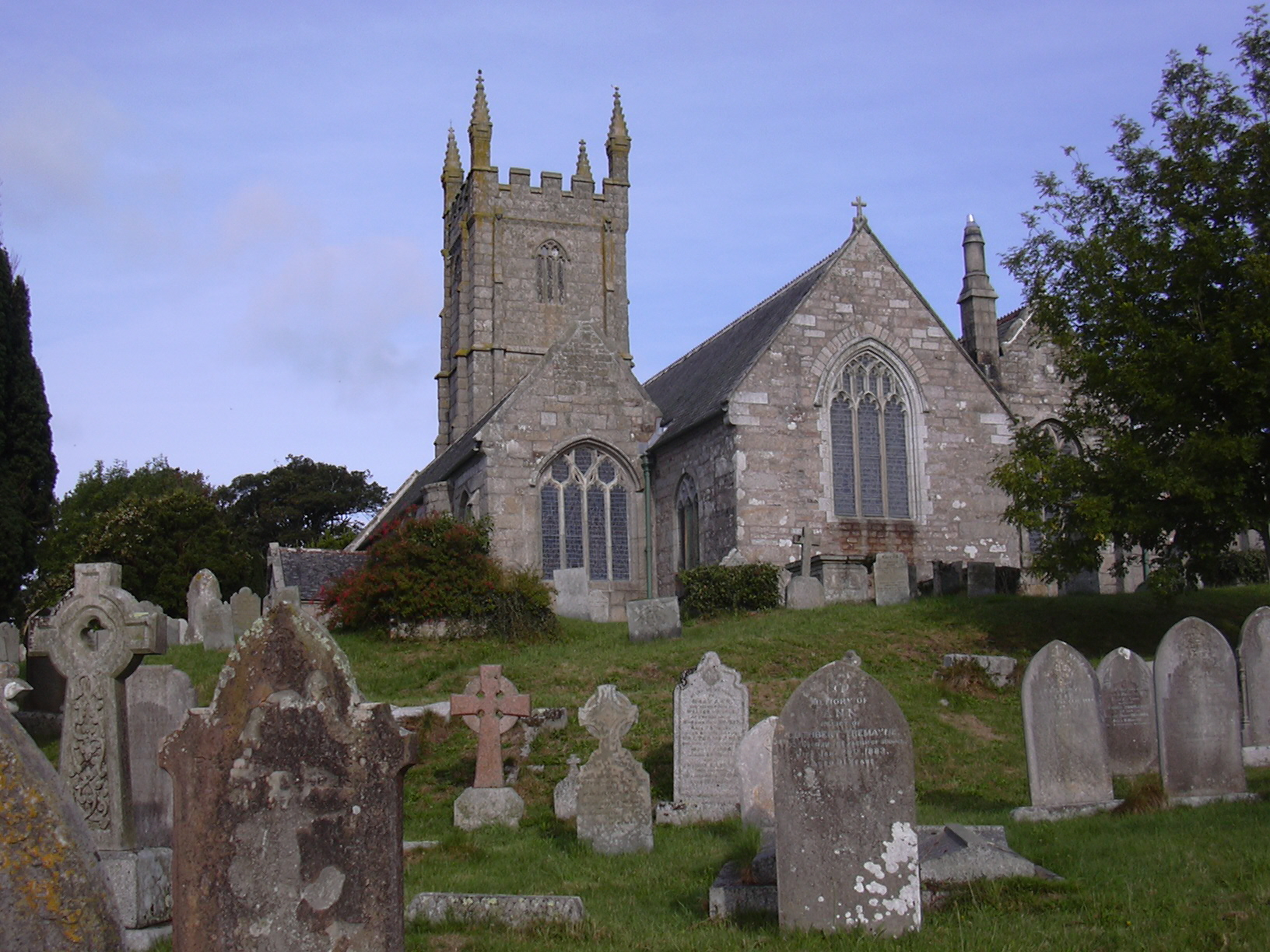
Saint Constantine's Church in Constantine, Cornwall, perhaps connected to the historical king of Dumnonia

The historical Constantine of Dumnonia may have influenced later traditions, known in southwestern Britain as well as in Wales, Ireland, and Scotland, about a Saint Constantine who is usually said to have been a king who gave up his crown to become a monk. The Cornish and Welsh traditions especially may have been influenced by Gildas, in particular his adjuration for Constantine to repent; the belief may have been that the reproach eventually worked.

The two major centers for the cultus of Saint Constantine were the church in Constantine Parish and the Chapel of Saint Constantine in St Merryn Parish (now Constantine Bay), both in Cornwall. The former was established by at least the 11th century, as it is mentioned in Rhygyfarch's 11th-century Life of Saint David. At this time it may have supported a clerical community, but in later centuries it was simply a parish church. The Chapel at Constantine Bay had a holy well, and was the center of its own sub-parish.

The Annales Cambriae (Welsh Annals) and the Annals of Ulster record the conversion of a certain Constantine; these may be a reference to the Cornish saint and therefore to the historical figure. Several subsequent religious texts refer to Constantine, generally associating him with Cornwall, often specifically as its king. The Life of Saint David says that Constantine, King of Cornwall, gave up his crown and joined Saint David's monastery at Menevia. The Vitae Petroci includes an episode in which Saint Petroc protects a stag being hunted by a wealthy man named Constantine, who eventually converts and becomes a monk. Here Constantine is not said to be king, but a 12th-century text referring to this story, the Miracula, specifically names him as such, further adding that upon his conversion he gave Petroc an ivory horn that became one of the saint's chief relics. A number of other traditions attested across Britain describe saints or kings named Constantine, suggesting a confusion and conflation of various figures.

Other sites in Southwestern Britain associated with figures named Constantine include the church of Milton Abbot, Devon; a chapel in nearby Dunterton, Devon; and a chapel in Illogan, Cornwall. The two Devon sites may have been dedicated instead to Constantine the Great, as local churches were subject to Tavistock Abbey, dedicated to Constantine the Great's mother Helena. In Wales, two churches were dedicated to Constantine: Llangystennin (in Conwy) and Welsh Bicknor (now in Herefordshire, England). The church in Govan, a parish in present-day Scotland, was also dedicated to a Saint Constantine.

== Geoffrey of Monmouth and the chronicle tradition ==
=== Historia Regum Britanniae ===
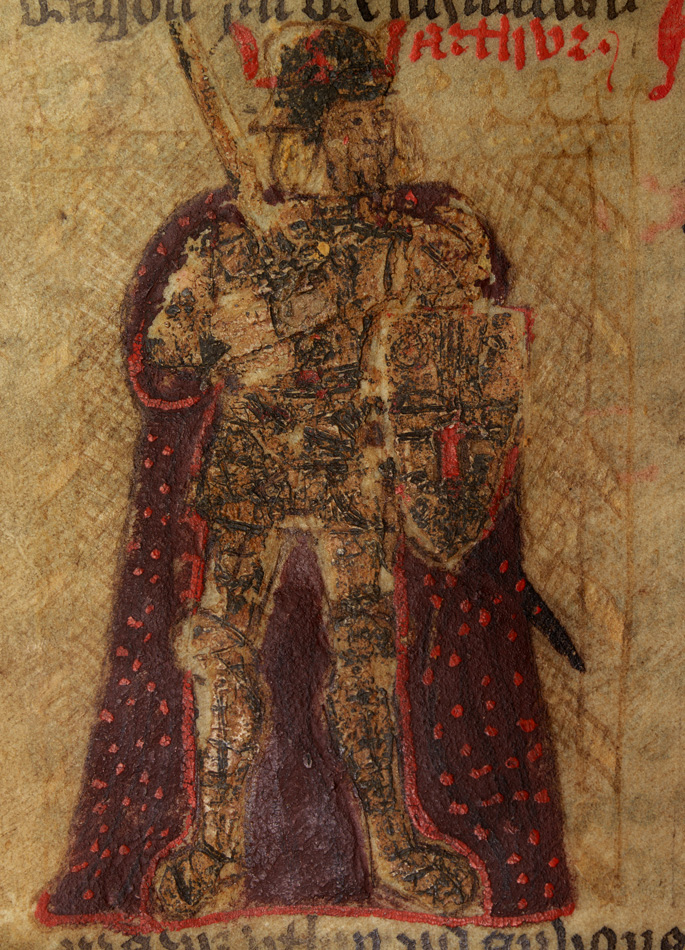
King Arthur from a 15th-century copy of Brut y Brenhinedd

Geoffrey of Monmouth includes Constantine in a section of his Historia Regum Britanniae adapted from Gildas. As he does throughout the work, Geoffrey alters his source material, recasting Gildas' reproved kings as successors, rather than contemporaries as in De Excidio. In addition to Gildas, Geoffrey evidently knew the Dumnonian genealogy essentially as it appears in Geraint and Enid and similar sources. He further adds a number of other details not found in earlier sources, identifying Constantine as a son of Cador, a Cornish ruler known in Welsh tradition as Cadwy mab Geraint. Notably, Geoffrey's Constantine is King Arthur's kinsman and succeeds him as King of the Britons. Norris J. Lacy and Geoffrey Ashe suggest Geoffrey made this Arthurian connection based on an existing tradition locating Arthur's birthplace in southwest Britain. However, noting that the earliest references place Arthur in northern Britain rather than the southwest, Rachel Bromwich considers the connection an arbitrary invention by Geoffrey, perhaps suggested by his earlier inventions of familial ties between Arthur and Constantine the Great and the Roman usurper Constantine III. Geoffrey calls Constantine Arthur's cognatus, or blood relative, but does not specify the exact relation, causing much confusion for later writers.

In Geoffrey, Arthur passes his crown to his relative Constantine after being mortally wounded by the traitor Mordred in the Battle of Camlann. Geoffrey identifies Gildas' "royal youths" as Mordred's two sons, who, along with their Saxon allies, continue their father's insurrection after his death. After "many battles" Constantine routs the rebels, and Mordred's sons flee to London and Winchester, where they hide in a church and a friary, respectively. Constantine hunts them down and executes them before the altars of their sanctuaries. Divine retribution for this transgression comes three years later when Constantine is killed by his nephew Aurelius Conanus (Gildas' Aurelius Caninus), precipitating a civil war. He is buried at Stonehenge alongside other kings of Britain.

Latin scholar Neil Wright considers Geoffrey's changes to Gildas to be deliberate reformulations that produce a more sympathetic picture of Constantine and his successors. For Wright, identifying the "royal youths" as traitors justifies the killing, reducing Constantine's offence from murder to sacrilege (for killing the traitors in sanctuary). Overall, scholars regard Geoffrey's depiction of Constantine as pessimistic, highlighting how little of Arthur's legacy survives his death.

=== Later chronicles ===
Geoffrey returned to Constantine's struggles and untimely murder in his later work Vita Merlini. The text, set during the reign of Aurelius Conanus, recounts how Constantine gave Mordred's sons a "cruel death" and ended their destructive rebellion, omitting details of the killing. According to the Vita, Constantine ruled only briefly before Conanus rose up, killed him, and seized the kingdom he now governs poorly. Rosemary Morris writes that Vita Merlini reinforces the Historia's message that Constantine was unable to perpetuate the glories of Arthur's reign.

Variants of Geoffrey's version of Constantine appeared in the numerous later adaptations of the Historia, which were widely regarded as authentic in the Middle Ages. Such variants include Wace's Anglo-Norman Roman de Brut, the Welsh Brut y Brenhinedd, and Layamon's English Brut. These typically reflect Geoffrey's cynicism about the character. Layamon, however, adds a touch of optimism, writing that Constantine successfully if briefly answered Arthur's charge to rule in his manner. Following Geoffrey, many of these works do not expand upon Constantine's relation to Arthur, though others elaborate that he is Arthur's nephew. Taking hints from Geoffrey's version of Arthur's family tree, these writers make Constantine's father Cador a brother, or half-brother, of Arthur through Arthur's mother Igraine.

== Later traditions ==
=== Medieval romance and prose tradition ===
Constantine does not figure strongly in the Arthurian romance traditions or prose cycles. He is absent from the French Vulgate and Post-Vulgate Cycles, in which Lancelot and his kin kill off Mordred's sons, and no successor to Arthur appears. Some scholars find this omission significant. Rosemary Morris suggests these versions downplay the issue of a designated heir to Arthur to heighten the stakes of Mordred's usurpation and to magnify Lancelot's role in the story. Richard Trachsler writes that the exclusion of an heir adds a sense of finality to the Arthurian story after Arthur's death.

Constantine does appear in some medieval works. In Jean d'Outremeuse's 14th-century Ly Myreur des Histors, Lancelot installs Constantine on the throne after Arthur's death. He is king of Britain in some versions of the Havelok the Dane legend, beginning with Geoffrey Gaimar's 12th-century Estoire des Engleis. He is also mentioned as Arthur's successor in the 14th-century English alliterative poem known as the Alliterative Morte Arthure, following Arthur's war with the Romans and his subsequent mortal battle with Mordred. Other English romances that reference Constantine in passing include the 14th-century The Awntyrs off Arthure and Sir Gawain and the Carle of Carlisle, written around 1400. Jorge Ferreira de Vasconcelos's 16th-century Portuguese novel Memorial das Proezas da Segunda Távola Redonda fuses Constantine with the ubiquitous Round Table knight Sagramore, creating "Sagramor Constantino", Arthur's son-in-law and heir. As king, he forms a new Round Table to defeat the old enemies and continue the glory of Arthurian Britain.

Constantine's relation to Arthur varies widely in these later works. Many works leave it unstated, while others follow the chronicles in making Constantine Arthur's nephew. Several romances, especially English works, cast him as Arthur's grand-nephew, with Cador being the son of a (generally unnamed) sister of the king.

Constantine also appears as Arthur's heir in Thomas Malory's Le Morte d'Arthur, including sections adapted from the Alliterative Morte Arthure. Malory makes several changes to his source material that expand Constantine's role. Malory has Arthur designate Constantine and Baldwin of Britain as regents before going off to fight the Romans, a role that the Alliterative Morte ascribes to Mordred. Eugène Vinaver suggests that Malory modelled this change after Henry V's appointment of John, Duke of Bedford and Bishop Henry Beaufort as regents. Others finds it likelier that Malory simply wanted to replace Mordred in the Roman war narrative. Malory also expands Constantine's role after Arthur's death, saying that he ruled honourably and restored the Bishop of Canterbury to his seat. Scholars note that this expansion closes the book on a much more optimistic note than Malory's sources, indicating that Arthurian ideals lived on under Constantine.

=== Modern literature and media ===
Constantine features in some modern treatments of the legend. Katrina Trask's Under King Constantine, an 1892 book comprising three long romantic poems, is set in his reign. He is an important unseen character in Henry Newbolt's 1895 play Mordred in his usual role as Arthur's successor. He similarly appears in Rosemary Sutcliff's 1963 novel Sword at Sunset, in which the grievously wounded "Artos" voluntarily passes the crown to him. In Parke Godwin's 1984 novel Beloved Exile, Constantine is one of several nobles fighting Guenevere, the protagonist, in a bid to succeed Arthur. He is the chief protagonist of the 1990 computer game Spirit of Excalibur; players control Constantine and his allies as they defend the kingdom after Arthur's death. Darrell Schweitzer's 1995 fantasy story "The Epilogue of the Sword" features an ageing Lancelot returning to serve Constantine against the Saxons. Constantine elaborately figures into Arthur Phillips' 2011 novel The Tragedy of Arthur, which centers on an apocryphal Arthurian play attributed to William Shakespeare that the narrator, a fictional version of Phillips, insists is a hoax created by his father. In the play-within-the-novel, Constantine is Guenhera's brother and Arthur's vassal and heir; the novel's narrator claims that Constantine is based on his father's old nemesis, prosecutor Ted Constantine.

== Notes ==
Legendary titles
Preceded by Cador	Duke of Cornwall	Unknown Next known title holder: Blederic
Preceded by Arthur	King of Britain	Succeeded by Aurelius Conanus
