= Battle of Woden's Burg (592) =

Battle fought in England in 592

Coordinates: 51.3556°N 1.8372°W

Battle of Woden's Barrow (592)
- Part of the Anglo-Saxon settlement of Britain
Date	592
Location	Adam's Grave, Wiltshire
Result	West Saxon defeat

Belligerents
West Saxons	Britons

Commanders and leaders
Ceawlin	Unknown

The Anglo-Saxon Chronicle records a battle fought in the year 592 at Woden's Barrow (Old English "Wōdnesbeorġ"), the Neolithic long barrow now known as Adam's Grave, near Marlborough, Wiltshire. The year entry states: "Her micel wælfill wæs æt Woddes beorge, 7 Ceawlin wæs ut adrifen." (There was great slaughter at Woden's hill, and Ceawlin was driven out.)

Ceawlin was king of Anglo-Saxon Wessex. In most versions of the Anglo-Saxon Chronicle the entry does not record the identity of the force opposing Ceawlin but one version, Manuscript E, says they were Britons. Yorke, however, says the opponent was Ceol, Ceawlin's nephew. Ceawlin is recorded as dying the following year and was succeeded by Ceol; his son Cuthwine went into exile.

The Chronicle records a second battle on the same site in the year 715. The area was of strategic importance since it lay near the intersection of the ancient Ridgeway with Wansdyke.
