= Battle of Cefn Digoll =

Battle fought in 630 at Long Mountain near Welshpool in modern-day Wales

Coordinates: 52°39′N 3°04′W

Date	c. 630
Location	Long Mountain near Welshpool, Wales
Result	Gwynedd-Mercian victory
Territorial changes	Northumbrian domination of Gwynedd ended

Belligerents
Kingdom of Gwynedd; Kingdom of Mercia	Kingdom of Northumbria

Commanders and leaders
Cadwallon ap Cadfan; Penda of Mercia	Edwin of Northumbria

Strength
Unknown	Unknown

Casualties and losses
Unknown	Unknown

The Battle of Cefn Digoll, also known as the Battle of the Long Mynd, was fought in 630 at Long Mountain near Welshpool in modern-day Wales. The battle was fought between the Northumbrian army of King Edwin of Northumbria and an anti-Northumbrian alliance between King Cadwallon of Gwynedd and Penda of Mercia. The battle ended the Northumbrian domination of Gwynedd, and preceded a Welsh campaign into Northumbria, which led to Edwin's death at the Battle of Hatfield Chase.
