= Donyarth =

Last recorded king of Cornwall

- King of Cornwall
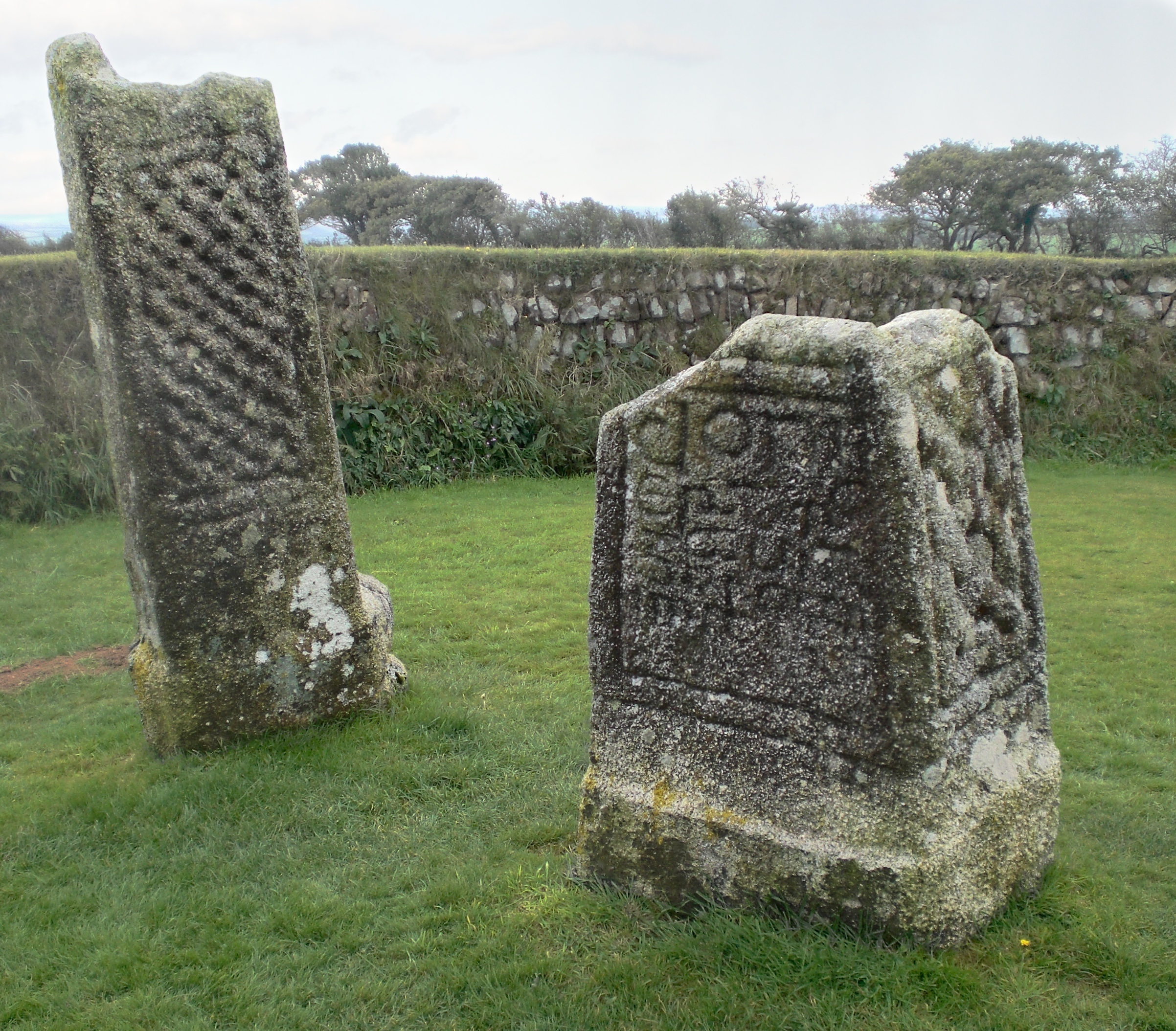
- King Doniert's Stone in 2007
- Reign: ? – 875
- Died: 875; River Fowey, Cornwall

Donyarth (Latin: Doniert) or Dungarth (died 875) was the last recorded king of Cornwall. He was probably an under-king, paying tribute to the West Saxons.

He is thought to be the 'Doniert' recorded on an inscription on King Doniert's Stone, a 9th-century cross shaft which stands in St Cleer parish in Cornwall, although he is not given any title in the inscription. The inscription reads doniert rogavit pro anima, Latin for "Doniert has asked [for this to be made] for his soul['s sake]".

According to the Annales Cambriae, he drowned in 875. His death may have been an accident, but it was recorded in Ireland as a punishment for collaboration with the Vikings, who were harrying the West Saxons and briefly occupied Exeter in 876 before being driven out by Alfred the Great following the victory of Odda, Ealdorman of Devon at the Battle of Cynwit in 878. Philip Payton suggests that he drowned in the River Fowey, near King Doniert's Stone.

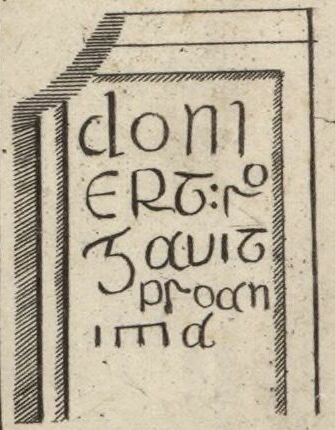
A depiction of King Doniert's Stone.

== See also ==
- Cornovii (Cornwall)
