= Book of Baglan =

The Book of Baglan (Llyfr Baglan in Welsh) is a collection of old Welsh manuscripts, containing much genealogical data, compiled by John Williams from several sources between 1600 and 1607. It was transcribed from the original manuscript preserved in the public library at Cardiff, and edited by Joseph Bradney with explanatory notes for reprinting in 1910. It is also available at the National Library of Wales on microfilm.

It is considered a valuable reference for Welsh genealogy, although it is not considered wholly accurate. The book contains numerous South Welsh pedigrees of minor gentry families, including local lords, the Kings of Gwent, the Earls of Pembroke, and the bard Rhys Goch, and contains descriptions of the heraldry of various lines.

== See also ==
- Harleian genealogies
- Genealogies from Jesus College MS 20
- Bonedd Gwŷr y Gogledd
