= Creoda of Wessex =

Disputed king of Wessex (c. 534)

Creoda

King of Wessex (disputed)
- Reign: perhaps 534
- Predecessor: Cerdic
- Successor: Cynric
- Died: Wessex
- Issue: Cynric? (possibly)
- Father: Cerdic

Creoda (493? – 534?) is an unreliably attested figure from early Wessex history.

== Introduction ==
The name Creoda appears in the Anglian king-list and the (possibly derived) West Saxon Genealogical Regnal List, where he is stated to have been the son of Cerdic and father to Cynric. However, the main annalistic section of the Anglo-Saxon Chronicle omits any mention of Creoda, and describes Cynric as the son of Cerdic. Similar contradiction occurs in surviving copies of the now-lost The Life of King Alfred, which Asser commenced with a paternal ancestry of Alfred the Great that includes the name Creoda between Cerdic and Cynric, but the following section relating Alfred's maternal ancestry calls Cynric the son of Cerdic.

If he existed, Creoda may have ruled Wessex for a short period of time immediately after Cerdic's death.

== Conflicting theories ==
If the historical existence of Creoda is admitted, there are a number of theories as to his identity and why he appears in some primary sources, but not others:

1. His inclusion in the genealogies was original, and his name was removed from some lists at a late date for dynastic and political reasons.
2. He was a contemporary of Cerdic and Cynric, but ruled the Thames Valley Saxons, while they ruled the Hampshire Saxons. He is seen as the ancestor of the later kings: Ceawlin, Cædwalla and Ine. At some late date, Creoda was inserted into the Cerdicing line as the son of Cerdic, when descent from Cerdic became necessary for any king of Wessex.
3. Creoda has been confused with Cerdic and some of Cerdic's later activities have been misassigned in the texts, and were originally those of Creoda and Cynric.

== Bibliography ==
- Asser (trans. Giles, J.A.) (2000) Annals of the Reign of Alfred the Great, In parentheses Publications: Medieval Latin Series, Cambridge, Ontario.
- Kirby, D.P. (1965) "Problems of Early West Saxon History", The English Historical Review, January 1965, Vol. 80, No. 314, Oxford University Press, pp. 10–29.
- Stevenson, W.H. (1899) "The Beginnings of Wessex", The English Historical Review, January 1899, Vol. 14, No. 53, Oxford University Press, pp. 32–46.
- Walker, H. E. (1956). "Bede and the Gewissae: The Political Evolution of the Heptarchy and Its Nomenclature". The Cambridge Historical Journal. Vol. 12 No. 2. Cambridge University Press. pp. 174–186. JSTOR 3021094.
