= Ceawlin of Wessex =

King of Wessex from 560 to 592

Ceawlin
- Ceawlin's name as it appears in the Anglo-Saxon Chronicle, as Ceaulin

King of Wessex
- Reign: 560–592
- Predecessor: Cynric
- Successor: Ceol
- Died: 593
- Issue: Cutha (possibly); Cuthwine
- House: Wessex
- Father: Cynric of Wessex

Ceawlin ([ˈtʃæɑw.lin] CHOW-lin; also spelled Ceaulin, Caelin, Celin, died ca. 593) was a King of Wessex. He may have been the son of Cynric of Wessex and the grandson of Cerdic of Wessex, whom the Anglo-Saxon Chronicle represents as the leader of the first group of Saxons to come to the land which later became Wessex. Ceawlin was active during the last years of the Anglo-Saxon expansion, with little of southern England remaining in the control of the native Britons by the time of his death.

The chronology of Ceawlin's life is highly uncertain. The historical accuracy and dating of many of the events in the later Anglo-Saxon Chronicle have been called into question, and his reign is variously listed as lasting seven, seventeen, or thirty-two years. The Chronicle records several battles of Ceawlin's between the years 556 and 592, including the first record of a battle between different groups of Anglo-Saxons, and indicates that under Ceawlin Wessex acquired significant territory, some of which was later to be lost to other Anglo-Saxon kingdoms. Ceawlin is also named as one of the eight "bretwaldas", a title given in the Chronicle to eight rulers who had overlordship over southern Britain, although the extent of Ceawlin's control is not known.

Ceawlin died in 593, having been deposed the year before, possibly by his successor, Ceol. He is recorded in various sources as having two sons, Cutha and Cuthwine, but the genealogies in which this information is found are known to be unreliable.

== Historical context ==
The history of the sub-Roman period in Britain is poorly sourced and the subject of a number of important disagreements among historians. It appears, however, that in the fifth century, raids on Britain by continental peoples developed into migrations. The newcomers included Angles, Saxons, Jutes and Frisians. These peoples captured territory in the east and south of England, but at about the end of the fifth century, a British victory at the battle of Mons Badonicus halted the Anglo-Saxon advance for fifty years. Near the year 550, however, the British began to lose ground once more, and within twenty-five years, it appears that control of almost all of southern England was in the hands of the invaders.

The peace following the battle of Mons Badonicus is attested partly by Gildas, a monk, who wrote De Excidio et Conquestu Britanniae or On the Ruin and Conquest of Britain during the middle of the sixth century. This essay is a polemic against corruption and Gildas provides little in the way of names and dates. He appears, however, to state that peace had lasted from the year of his birth to the time he was writing. The Anglo-Saxon Chronicle is the other main source that bears on this period, in particular in an entry for the year 827 that records a list of the kings who bore the title "bretwalda", or "Britain-ruler". That list shows a gap in the early sixth century that matches Gildas's version of events.

Ceawlin's reign belongs to the period of Anglo-Saxon expansion at the end of the sixth century. Though there are many unanswered questions about the chronology and activities of the early West Saxon rulers, it is clear that Ceawlin was one of the key figures in the final Anglo-Saxon conquest of southern Britain.

== Early West Saxon sources ==
The two main written sources for early West Saxon history are the Anglo-Saxon Chronicle and the West Saxon Genealogical Regnal List. The Chronicle is a set of annals which were compiled near the year 890, during the reign of King Alfred the Great of Wessex. They record earlier material for the older entries, which were assembled from earlier annals that no longer survive, as well as from saga material that might have been transmitted orally. The Chronicle dates the arrival of the future "West Saxons" in Britain to 495, when Cerdic and his son, Cynric, land at Cerdices ora, or Cerdic's shore. Almost twenty annals describing Cerdic's campaigns and those of his descendants appear interspersed through the next hundred years of entries in the Chronicle. Although these annals provide most of what is known about Ceawlin, the historicity of many of the entries is uncertain.

The West Saxon Genealogical Regnal List is a list of rulers of Wessex, including the lengths of their reigns. It survives in several forms, including as a preface to the [B] manuscript of the Chronicle. Like the Chronicle, the List was compiled in its present form during the reign of Alfred the Great, but an earlier version of the List was also one of the sources of the Chronicle itself. Both the list and the Chronicle are influenced by the desire of their writers to use a single line of descent to trace the lineage of the Kings of Wessex through Cerdic to Gewis, the legendary eponymous ancestor of the West Saxons, who is made to descend from Woden. The result served the political purposes of the scribe but is riddled with contradictions for historians.

The contradictions may be seen clearly by calculating dates by different methods from various sources. The first event in West Saxon history whose date can be regarded as reasonably certain is the baptism of Cynegils, which occurred in the late 630s, perhaps as late as 640. The Chronicle dates Cerdic's arrival to 495, but adding up the lengths of the reigns as given in the West Saxon Genealogical Regnal List leads to the conclusion that Cerdic's reign might have started in 532, a difference of 37 years. Neither 495 nor 532 may be treated as reliable; however, the latter date relies on the presumption that the Regnal List is correct in presenting the Kings of Wessex as having succeeded one another, with no omitted kings, and no joint kingships, and that the durations of the reigns are correct as given. None of these presumptions may be made safely.

The sources also are inconsistent on the length of Ceawlin's reign. The Chronicle gives it as thirty-two years, from 560 to 592, but the manuscripts of the Regnal List disagree: different copies give it as seven or seventeen years. David Dumville's detailed study of the Regnal List finds that it originally dated the arrival of the West Saxons in England to 532, and favours seven years as the earliest claimed length of Ceawlin's reign, with dates of 581–588 proposed. Dumville suggests that Ceawlin's reign length was then inflated to help extend the longevity of the Cerdicing dynasty further back into the past and that Ceawlin's reign specifically was extended because he is mentioned by Bede, giving him a status which led later West Saxon historians to conclude that he deserved a more impressive-looking reign. The sources do agree that Ceawlin is the son of Cynric and he usually is named as the father of Cuthwine. There is one discrepancy in this case: the entry for 685 in the [A] version of the Chronicle assigns Ceawlin a son, Cutha, but in the 855 entry in the same manuscript, Cutha is listed as the son of Cuthwine. Cutha also is named as Ceawlin's brother in the [E] and [F] versions of the Chronicle, in the 571 and 568 entries, respectively.

Whether Ceawlin is a descendant of Cerdic is a matter of debate. Subgroupings of different West Saxon lineages give the impression of separate groups, of which Ceawlin's line is one. Some of the problems in the Wessex genealogies may have come about because of efforts to integrate Ceawlin's line with the other lineages: it became very important to the West Saxons to be able to trace the ancestors of their rulers back to Cerdic. Another reason for doubting the literal nature of these early genealogies is that the etymology of the names of several early members of the dynasty does not appear to be Germanic, as would be expected in the names of leaders of an apparently Anglo-Saxon dynasty. The name Ceawlin has no convincing Old English etymology; it seems more likely to be of British origin.

The earliest sources do not use the term "West Saxon". According to Bede's Ecclesiastical History of the English People, the term is interchangeable with the Gewisse. The term "West Saxon" appears only in the late seventh century, after the reign of Cædwalla.

== West Saxon expansion ==
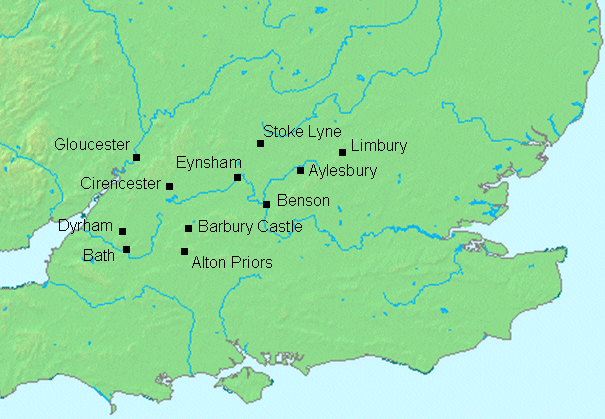
A map of places mentioned by the Anglo-Saxon Chronicle in annals relating to Ceawlin; modern versions of the place names are given here, rather than the Anglo-Saxon names used in the chronicle.

Ultimately, the kingdom of Wessex occupied the southwest of England, but the initial stages in this expansion are not apparent from the sources. Cerdic's landing, whenever it is to be dated, seems to have been near the Isle of Wight, and the annals record the conquest of the island in 530. In 534, according to the Chronicle, Cerdic died and his son Cynric took the throne; the Chronicle adds that "they gave the Isle of Wight to their nephews, Stuf and Wihtgar". These records are in direct conflict with Bede, who states that the Isle of Wight was settled by Jutes, not Saxons; the archaeological record is somewhat in favour of Bede on this.

Subsequent entries in the Chronicle give details of some of the battles by which the West Saxons won their kingdom. Ceawlin's campaigns are not given as near the coast. They range along the Thames Valley and beyond, as far as Surrey in the east and the mouth of the Severn in the west. Ceawlin clearly is part of the West Saxon expansion, but the military history of the period is difficult to understand. In what follows the dates are as given in the Chronicle, although, as noted above, these are earlier than now thought accurate.

=== 556: Beran byrg ===
The first record of a battle fought by Ceawlin is in 556, when he and his father, Cynric, fought the native Britons at "Beran byrg", or Bera's Stronghold. This now is identified as Barbury Castle, an Iron Age hill fort in Wiltshire, near Swindon. Cynric would have been king of Wessex at this time.

=== 568: Wibbandun ===
The first battle Ceawlin fought as king is dated by the Chronicle to 568 when he and Cutha fought with Æthelberht, the king of Kent. The entry says "Here Ceawlin and Cutha fought against Aethelberht and drove him into Kent; and they killed two ealdormen, Oslaf and Cnebba, on Wibbandun." The location of "Wibbandun", which can be translated as "Wibba's Mount", has not been identified definitely; it was at one time thought to be Wimbledon, but this now is known to be incorrect.

David Cooper proposes Wyboston, a small village 8 miles north-east of Bedford on the west bank of the Great Ouse. Wibbandun is often written as Wibba's Dun, which is close phonetically to Wyboston and Æthelberht's dominance, from Kent to the Humber according to Bede, extended across those Anglian territories south of the Wash. It was this region that came under threat from Ceawlin as he looked to establish a defensible boundary on the Great Ouse River in the easternmost part of his territory. In addition, Cnebba, named as slain in this battle, has been associated with Knebworth, which lies 20 miles to the south of Wyboston. Half a mile south of Wyboston is a village called Chawston. The origin of the place name is unknown but might be derived from the Old English Ceawston or Ceawlinston. A defeat at Wyboston for Æthelberht would have damaged his overlord status and diminished his influence over the Anglians. The idea that he was driven or "pursued" into Kent (depending on which Anglo-Saxon Chronicle translation is preferred) should not be taken literally. Similar phraseology is often found in the Chronicle when one king bests another. A defeat suffered as part of an expedition to help his Anglian clients would have caused Æthelberht to withdraw into Kent to recover.

This battle is notable as the first recorded conflict between the invading peoples: previous battles recorded in the Chronicle are between the Anglo-Saxons and the native Britons.

There are multiple examples of joint kingship in Anglo-Saxon history, and this may be another: it is not clear what Cutha's relationship to Ceawlin is, but it certainly is possible he was also a king. The annal for 577, below, is another possible example.

=== 571: Bedcanford ===
The annal for 571 reads: "Here Cuthwulf fought against the Britons at Bedcanford, and took four settlements: Limbury and Aylesbury, Benson and Eynsham; and in the same year he passed away." Cuthwulf's relationship with Ceawlin is unknown, but the alliteration common to Anglo-Saxon royal families suggests Cuthwulf may be part of the West Saxon royal line. The location of the battle itself is unidentified. It has been suggested that it was Bedford, but what is known of the early history of Bedford's names does not support this. This battle is of interest because it is surprising that an area so far east should still be in Briton hands this late: there is ample archaeological evidence of early Saxon and Anglian presence in the Midlands, and historians generally have interpreted Gildas's De Excidio as implying that the Britons had lost control of this area by the mid-sixth century. One possible explanation is that this annal records a reconquest of land that was lost to the Britons in the campaigns ending in the battle of Mons Badonicus.

=== 577: Lower Severn ===
The annal for 577 reads "Here Cuthwine and Ceawlin fought against the Britons, and they killed three kings, Coinmail and Condidan and Farinmail, in the place which is called Dyrham, and took three cities: Gloucester and Cirencester and Bath." This entry is all that is known of these Briton kings; their names are in an archaic form that makes it very likely that this annal derives from a much older written source. The battle itself has long been regarded as a key moment in the Saxon advance, since in reaching the Bristol Channel, the West Saxons divided the Britons west of the Severn from land communication with those in the peninsula to the south of the Channel. Wessex almost certainly lost this territory to Penda of Mercia in 628, when the Chronicle records that "Cynegils and Cwichelm fought against Penda at Cirencester and then came to an agreement."

It is possible that when Ceawlin and Cuthwine took Bath, they found the Roman baths still operating to some extent. Nennius, a ninth-century historian, mentions a "Hot Lake" in the land of the Hwicce, which was along the Severn, and adds "It is surrounded by a wall, made of brick and stone, and men may go there to bathe at any time, and every man can have the kind of bath he likes. If he wants, it will be a cold bath; and if he wants a hot bath, it will be hot". Bede also describes hot baths in the geographical introduction to the Ecclesiastical History in terms very similar to those of Nennius.

Wansdyke, an early-medieval defensive linear earthwork, runs from south of Bristol to near Marlborough, Wiltshire, passing not far from Bath. It probably was built in the fifth or sixth centuries, perhaps by Ceawlin.

=== 584: Fethan leag ===
Ceawlin's last recorded victory is in 584. The entry reads "Here Ceawlin and Cutha fought against the Britons at the place which is named Fethan leag, and Cutha was killed, and Ceawlin took many towns and countless war-loot, and in anger, he turned back to his own [territory]." There is a wood named "Fethelée" mentioned in a twelfth-century document that relates to Stoke Lyne, in Oxfordshire, and it now is thought that the battle of Fethan leag must have been fought in this area.

The phrase "in anger he turned back to his own" probably indicates that this annal is drawn from saga material, as perhaps are all of the early Wessex annals. It also has been used to argue that perhaps, Ceawlin did not win the battle and that the chronicler chose not to record the outcome fully—a king does not usually come home "in anger" after taking "many towns and countless war-loot". It may be that Ceawlin's overlordship of the southern Britons came to an end with this battle.

== Bretwaldaship ==
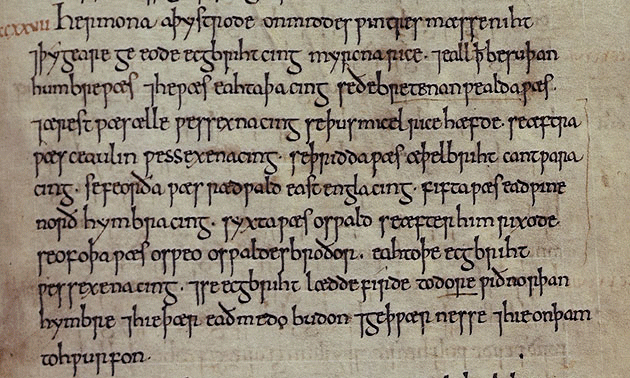
In the entry for 827 in the [C] manuscript of the Anglo-Saxon Chronicle, listing the eight bretwaldas, Ceawlin's name can be seen in the fifth line, spelled "Ceaulin".

About 731, Bede, a Northumbrian monk and chronicler, wrote a work called the Ecclesiastical History of the English People. The work was not primarily a secular history, but Bede provides much information about the history of the Anglo-Saxons, including a list early in the history of seven kings who, he said, held "imperium" over the other kingdoms south of the Humber. The usual translation for "imperium" is "overlordship". Bede names Ceawlin as the second on the list, although he spells it "Caelin", and adds that he was "known in the speech of his own people as Ceaulin". Bede also makes it clear that Ceawlin was not a Christian—Bede mentions a later king, Æthelberht of Kent, as "the first to enter the kingdom of heaven".

The Anglo-Saxon Chronicle, in an entry for the year 827, repeats Bede's list, adds Egbert of Wessex, and also mentions that they were known as "bretwalda", or "Britain-ruler". A great deal of scholarly attention has been given to the meaning of this word. It has been described as a term "of encomiastic poetry", but there also is evidence that it implied a definite role of military leadership.

Bede says that these kings had authority "south of the Humber", but the span of control, at least of the earlier bretwaldas, likely was less than this. In Ceawlin's case the range of control is hard to determine accurately, but Bede's inclusion of Ceawlin in the list of kings who held imperium, and the list of battles he is recorded as having won, indicates an energetic and successful leader who, from a base in the upper Thames valley, dominated much of the surrounding area and held overlordship over the southern Britons for some period. Despite Ceawlin's military successes, the northern conquests he made could not always be retained: Mercia took much of the upper Thames valley, and the north-eastern towns won in 571 were among territory subsequently under the control of Kent and Mercia at different times.

Bede's concept of the power of these overlords also must be regarded as the product of his eighth century viewpoint. When the Ecclesiastical History was written, Æthelbald of Mercia dominated the English south of the Humber, and Bede's view of the earlier kings was doubtless strongly coloured by the state of England at that time. For the earlier bretwaldas, such as Ælle and Ceawlin, there must be some element of anachronism in Bede's description. It also is possible that Bede only meant to refer to power over Anglo-Saxon kingdoms, not the native Britons.

Ceawlin is the second king on Bede's list. All the subsequent bretwaldas followed more or less consecutively, but there is a long gap, perhaps fifty years, between Ælle of Sussex, the first bretwalda, and Ceawlin. The lack of gaps between the overlordships of the later bretwaldas has been used to make an argument for Ceawlin's dates matching the later entries in the Chronicle with reasonable accuracy. According to this analysis, the next bretwalda, Æthelberht of Kent, must have been already a dominant king by the time Pope Gregory the Great wrote to him in 601, since Gregory would have not written to an underking. Ceawlin defeated Æthelberht in 568 according to the Chronicle. Æthelberht's dates are a matter of debate, but recent scholarly consensus has his reign starting no earlier than 580. The 568 date for the battle at Wibbandun is thought to be unlikely because of the assertion in various versions of the West Saxon Genealogical Regnal List that Ceawlin's reign lasted either seven or seventeen years. If this battle is placed near the year 590, before Æthelberht had established himself as a powerful king, then the subsequent annals relating to Ceawlin's defeat and death may be reasonably close to the correct date. In any case, the battle with Æthelberht is unlikely to have been more than a few years on either side of 590. The gap between Ælle and Ceawlin, on the other hand, has been taken as supporting evidence for the story told by Gildas in De Excidio of a peace lasting a generation or more following a Briton victory at Mons Badonicus.

Æthelberht of Kent succeeds Ceawlin on the list of bretwaldas, but the reigns may overlap somewhat: recent evaluations give Ceawlin a likely reign of 581–588, and place Æthelberht's accession near to the year 589, but these analyses are no more than scholarly guesses. Ceawlin's eclipse in 592, probably by Ceol, may have been the occasion for Æthelberht to rise to prominence; Æthelberht very likely was the dominant Anglo-Saxon king by 597. Æthelberht's rise may have been earlier: the 584 annal, even if it records a victory, is the last victory of Ceawlin's in the Chronicle, and the period after that may have been one of Æthelberht's ascent and Ceawlin's decline.

== Wessex at Ceawlin's death ==
The state of Anglo-Saxon England at Ceawlin's death

Ceawlin lost the throne of Wessex in 592. The annal for that year reads, in part: "Here there was great slaughter at Woden's Barrow, and Ceawlin was driven out." Woden's Barrow is a tumulus, now called Adam's Grave, at Alton Priors, Wiltshire. No details of his opponent are given. The medieval chronicler William of Malmesbury, writing in about 1120, says that it was "the Angles and the British conspiring together". Alternatively, it may have been Ceol, who is supposed to have been the next king of Wessex, ruling for six years according to the West Saxon Genealogical Regnal List. According to the Anglo-Saxon Chronicle, Ceawlin died the following year. The relevant part of the annal reads: "Here Ceawlin and Cwichelm and Crida perished." Nothing more is known of Cwichelm and Crida, although they may have been members of the Wessex royal house—their names fit the alliterative pattern common to royal houses of the time.

According to the Regnal List, Ceol was a son of Cutha, who was a son of Cynric; and Ceolwulf, his brother, reigned for seventeen years after him. It is possible that some fragmentation of control among the West Saxons occurred at Ceawlin's death: Ceol and Ceolwulf may have been based in Wiltshire, as opposed to the upper Thames valley. This split also may have contributed to Æthelberht's ability to rise to dominance in southern England. The West Saxons remained influential in military terms, however: the Chronicle and Bede record continued military activity against Essex and Sussex within twenty or thirty years of Ceawlin's death.

== See also ==
- List of monarchs of Wessex

== Notes ==
Regnal titles
Preceded by Cynric	King of Wessex; 560–592	Succeeded by Ceol
