= Ceretic =

Ceretic, Ceredig or Keredic may refer to:

- Ceretic Guletic, 5th-century king of Alt Clut in present-day Scotland
- Ceredig (c. 420 – 453), first king of Ceredigion in Wales
- Ceretic of Elmet (died 617), last king of Elmet, now in northern England
- Keredic, pseudohistorical king of the Britons in Geoffrey of Monmouth's Historia Regum Britanniae

== See also ==
- Cerdic of Wessex (died 534), king in southwest England
- Caradog (disambiguation)
- Cedric (disambiguation)
