= Anglian collection =

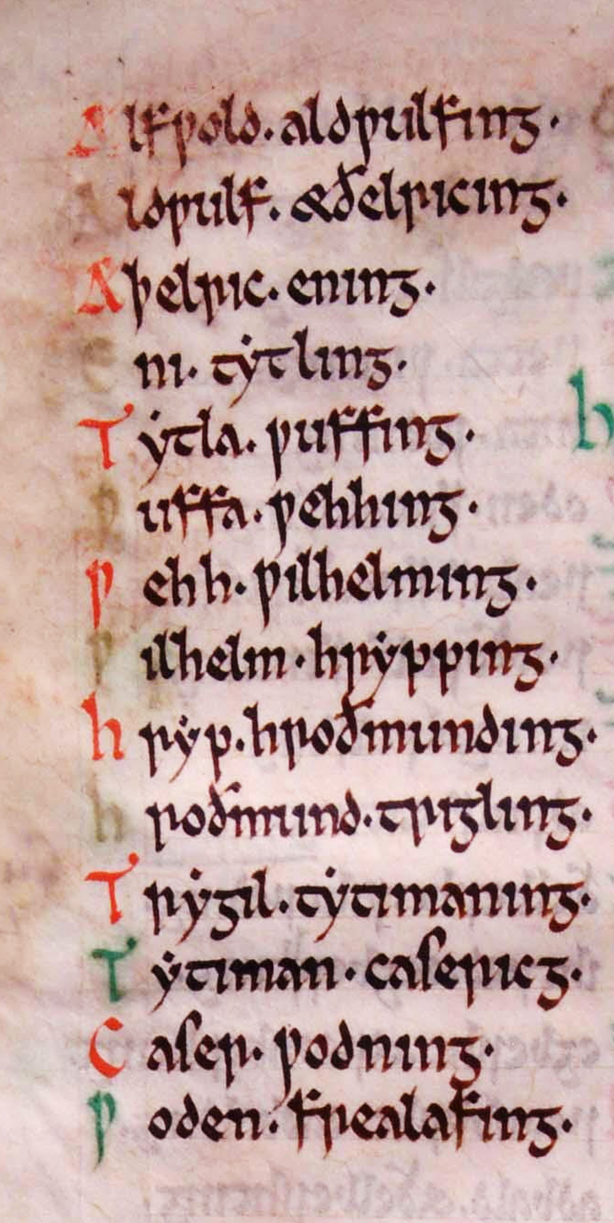
Lineage of East Anglian king Ælfwald from the Textus Roffensis, version R of the Anglian Collection.

The Anglian collection is a collection of Anglo-Saxon royal genealogies and regnal lists. These survive in four manuscripts; two of which now reside in the British Library. The remaining two belong to the libraries of Corpus Christi College, Cambridge and Rochester Cathedral, the latter now deposited with the Medway Archives.

== Compilation ==
All manuscripts appear to derive from a common source, now lost. Based on content and the pattern of divergence, Dumville dates the composition of the common source to 796 in Mercia. Both the genealogies and the episcopal lists were part of this original compilation, and have passed in tandem, with the surviving manuscripts all several steps removed from this original. All the manuscripts include genealogies for the kingdoms of Deira, Bernicia, Mercia, Lindsey, Kent and East Anglia. Three of them (C, T and R) also contain a West Saxon genealogy (which may have been a source for the West Saxon Genealogical Regnal List), and regnal lists for Northumbria and Mercia. This may represent material omitted or lost from the fourth (V) rather than addition to the other three. The genealogies are presented in reverse order, beginning with a ruler at the time it was composed and naming each successive generation back to Wodin, and in the Lindsey and Wessex pedigrees, beyond. The papal and episcopal lists, to a greater or lesser extent, have been updated during the course of transmission of the individual copies, but with the exception of the Wessex pedigree, the genealogies have largely remained unchanged except for error. Scholars agree that a collection of genealogies similar to those in the Vespasian manuscript was also a source for the genealogical section of Historia Brittonum. Dumville suggested specifically that the Historia used a Northumbrian precursor to the genealogical portion of the Anglian collection, provisionally dating its compilation to the 760s or 770s.

== Surviving manuscripts ==
The surviving manuscripts are listed below, in what is currently thought to be the chronological order of their composition.

Version	Location	Manuscript
V	British Library	Cotton MS. Vespasian B vi. fols. 104—109
C	Parker Library, Corpus Christi College, Cambridge	CCCC 183 fols. 59—67
T	British Library	Cotton MS. Tiberius B v., pt. 1, Anglo-Saxon Miscellany fols. 2—73,77—88, and Cotton MS. Nero D ii., fols 238–241
R	Rochester, Cathedral Library	A.3.5, Textus Roffensis fols. 102—118

=== Vespasian (V) ===
This is the oldest of the four surviving versions, and represents a separate branch of transmission than that leading to the other manuscripts. A single hand using Mercian script has recorded the genealogies and episcopal lists, bringing them down to the time of composition, 805 × 814 (probably closer to the end of that span). Mercian scribes would later update the episcopal lists, first to about 833 and much later to the 12th century, while the papal lists were updated to the time of later-9th century Pope Adrian II. The leaves containing the Anglian collection bear no resemblance to the remainder of the codex in which they were found, and probably were only bound together at the time they entered the Cottonian Library. The pages containing the Anglian collection have now been removed from their original volume and framed individually, and are catalogued as Vespasian B vi/1.

=== Parker CCCC (C) ===
The Parker version of the Anglian collection is part of a larger volume all written by the same two scribes using an Anglo-Celtic hand, and including most notably Bede's Vita Sancti Cuthberti. This volume was composed in South West England, perhaps at Glastonbury, and later in the Middle Ages was held by the Durham Cathedral Priory. At the start of the codex is an illustration of a king presenting a tome to a saint, leading to the hypothesis that this codex is the volume the Historia de Sancto Cuthberto described as being given to the congregation of Saint Cuthbert by king Æthelstan in the mid-930s, which matches the period to which some, but not all, of the episcopal lists are brought. This identification would place its composition in Wessex in the period 934 × 937. Manuscript C, along with T and R have material not found in V. They all have Northumbrian and Mercian regnal lists and a pedigree for Wessex, all present well before the dates of the surviving manuscripts and perhaps in the original. The pattern of shared updates suggest that the manuscript ancestral to all three was last updated in Mercia in the 840s before being moved to Wessex. The Mercia regnal list of C also contains two unique memoranda.

=== Tiberius (T) ===
The Anglian collection version T forms part of a computational, geographical and astrological collection. The volume is from the south of England and based in the writing was probably composed in the second quarter of the 11th century, though the chronological material in the regnal lists was most recently updated in the 990s. The Anglian collection material appears to have been copied at Canterbury from a now-lost manuscript held at Christ Church, and it then passed to Winchester, where additions to the Winchester Chronicle derived from the T manuscript. The Wessex royal pedigree has been extended both more recently and earlier, giving a descent that traces the three sons of king Edgar (and hence dates 966 × 969) back to Adam. It appears to have been added at Glastonbury before the manuscript went to Canterbury. The genealogies and regnal lists have a quirky arrangement and many errors, most notably a deletion that splices together the Northumbria and Mercian regnal lists, though these seem to have originated earlier on the course of transmission.

The errors and other unique feature in T mark it as the source for a set of Anglo-Saxon genealogies that found their way to Iceland. A set of pages from the library of P. H. Resen (1625—1688) date from the just after the middle of the 13th century, and contain the royal pedigrees of Deira, Kent and Wessex, as well as the descent from their shared ancestor Woden to 'Sescef' (i.e. "Se Scef" - 'this Scef' of the expanded Wessex pedigree). Anthony Foulkes has suggested that this is a copy of an earlier set of selective notes taken from manuscript T and transmitted to Iceland, where it provided the core genealogical material elaborated upon in the Preface to Snorri Sturluson's Prose Edda and Langfeðgatal to provide the Scandinavian dynasties with a genealogy tracing to antiquity.

=== Textus Roffensis (R) ===
The volume containing the R manuscript was composed at Rochester soon after 1122, using a common source with T for the Anglian collection. Though the same scribe wrote the entire codex, it appears to represent what were once two separate manuscripts, now bound together. The Anglian collection text is quite similar to that of T, and probably came from the same source, though some of the errors once shared with T have been erased and corrected. The last shared updates between T and R seem to date from 990 at Canterbury.

== Sources ==
- Dumville, David N. (1976). "The Anglian collection of royal genealogies and regnal lists". Anglo-Saxon England. 5. Cambridge University Press: 23–50. doi:10.1017/S0263675100000764. JSTOR 44510666. S2CID 162877617. (registration required)
