= Creoda =

Creoda may refer to:

- King Creoda of Mercia, Anglo-Saxon Monarch in the 6th century
- Creoda of Wessex, Anglo-Saxon royalty in the 6th century
