= Ceawlin (name) =

Ceawlin (Ċeawlin, [ˈtʃæɑw.lin] CHOW-lin; also spelled Cælin) is an Old English personal name.

== Etymology ==
The etymology of the name is uncertain. A key early attestation comes in Bede's Ecclesiastical History of the English People, where a list of kings who ruled "in regibus gentis Anglorum cunctis australibus" ("in all the southern regions of the people of the English") includes "Caelin rex Occidentalium Saxonum, qui lingua ipsorum Ceaulin uocabatur" ("Caelin king of the West Saxons, who in their language is called Ceaulin", book ii chapter 5). This indicates that the West Saxon dialect form of the name was (in the standardised spelling used in Old English scholarship today) Ceawlin, whereas Bede's Northumbrian form was Cælin. The presence of ea in the first syllable of the West Saxon form can be explained as palatal diphthongisation caused by the initial consonant, which happened more regularly in West Saxon than in Northumbrian, but the only attempt to explain the absence of the w appears to be Anderson's comment 'we may also note the loss of w in the Northumbrian form caelin of the pers. name ceaulin [...] The loss is probably due to hypocorism'. The i in the second syllable does not seem to have caused i-mutation, indicating that the name was coined or borrowed into Old English after that sound-change was complete.

An Old English personal name Ceawa is attested in two Berkshire place-names, Chawridge and West/East Challow, and some scholars have assumed that this name is related to Ceawlin.

Since there is no obvious Old English or wider Germanic origin for Ceawlin, commentators have frequently assumed that it must originate in the Celtic languages, like the name Cerdic borne by another early West Saxon king. However, no secure Celtic etymology has, as of 2019, been forthcoming:

- In 1941, O. S. Anderson suggested that the names were both contractions of the Welsh name Cadwallon, with the addition of the diminutive suffix -īn in the case of Ceawlin.
- While noting that no such name is found in the Celtic languages, Richard Coates cautiously suggested in 1989–90 that "It could be derived from a British *Cawolīnos or, better, a hypothetical Pr[oto]W[elsh] *Cawlīn", positing a relationship with the Welsh word caw ("skilled"), but lacking close parallels for the -līn element.
- Arguing that -lin was a diminutive suffix for names more widely in Old English, John Insley argued in 2019 that Ceawlin is a diminutive of Ceawa, but did not offer an etymology for that name. Unbeknownst to Insley, however, Ceawa had been etymologised by Gillis Kristensson as an Old English counterpart of Middle High German kouwe 'jaw, jawbone' (from West Germanic *kauwō-). In this case, Ceawlin would be a name of Old English etymology.

== People ==
Notable people with the name include:

- Cælin, an early English churchman
- Ceawlin of Wessex, d. c. 993
- Ceawlin Thynn, 8th Marquess of Bath
