= Wessex =

Anglo-Saxon kingdom in the south of Great Britain

Coordinates: 51.2°N 2°W

Kingdom of the West Saxons Old English: Ƿestseaxna rīċe Latin: Regnum Occidentalium Saxonum
- c. 519–927
- Southern Britain in the ninth century
- Status: Independent kingdom (c. 519 – c. 645; 648–927); Client state of Mercia (645–648)
- Religion: Anglo-Saxon paganism (before 7th century); Chalcedonian Christianity (after 7th century)
- Government: Monarchy
- King (List)
  - c. 519 – c. 534: Cerdic (first)
  - 688–726: Ine
  - 802–839: Ecgberht
  - 871–899: Alfred the Great
  - 899–924: Edward the Elder
  - 924–927 (last): Æthelstan
- History
  - Established: c. 519
  - Unification of the Angles, Saxons and Danes: 12 July 927
- Currency: Penny
Preceded by
Sub-Roman Britain
Gewisse
Kingdom of Kent
Succeeded by
Kingdom of England
- Today part of: United Kingdom; ∟ Southern England

The Kingdom of the West Saxons, also known as the Kingdom of Wessex, was an Anglo-Saxon kingdom in the south of Great Britain, from around 519 until around 927. In about 886, Alfred the Great adopted the title 'King of the Anglo-Saxons' as the ruler of all Anglo-Saxons not under Danish rule. Over the next thirty years Alfred's son, Edward the Elder and grandson Æthelstan conquered the Danish kingdoms, and when Æthelstan conquered the last surviving one, York, in 927, he adopted the title 'King of the English'.

The Anglo-Saxons believed that Wessex was founded by Cerdic and Cynric of the Gewisse, though this is considered by some to be a legend. The two main sources for the history of Wessex are the West Saxon Genealogical Regnal List and the Anglo-Saxon Chronicle (the latter of which drew on and adapted an early version of the List), which sometimes conflict. Wessex became a Christian kingdom after Cenwalh (r. 642–645, 648–672) was baptised and was expanded under his rule. Cædwalla later conquered Sussex, Kent and the Isle of Wight. His successor, Ine (r. 689–726), issued one of the oldest surviving English law codes and established a second West Saxon bishopric. The throne subsequently passed to a series of kings with unknown genealogies.

During the 8th century, as the hegemony of Mercia grew, Wessex largely retained its independence. It was during this period that the system of shires was established. Under Egbert, Surrey, Sussex, Kent, Essex, and Mercia, along with parts of Dumnonia, were conquered. He also obtained the overlordship of the Northumbrian king. However, Mercian independence was restored in 830. During the reign of his successor, Æthelwulf, a Danish army arrived in the Thames estuary, but was decisively defeated. When Æthelwulf's son, Æthelbald, usurped the throne, the kingdom was divided to avoid war. Æthelwulf was succeeded in turn by his four sons, the youngest being Alfred the Great.

Wessex was invaded by the Danes in 871, and Alfred was compelled to pay them to leave. They returned in 876, but were forced to withdraw. In 878, they forced Alfred to flee to the Somerset Levels, but were eventually defeated at the Battle of Edington. During his reign Alfred issued a new law code, gathered scholars to his court and was able to devote funds to building ships, organising an army and establishing a system of burhs. Alfred's son, Edward, captured the eastern Midlands and East Anglia from the Danes and became ruler of Mercia in 918 upon the death of his sister, Æthelflæd. Edward's son, Æthelstan, conquered Northumbria in 927, and England became a unified kingdom for the first time. Cnut the Great, who conquered England in 1016, created the wealthy and powerful earldom of Wessex, but in 1066 Harold Godwinson reunited the earldom with the crown and Wessex ceased to exist.

== History ==
=== Prehistoric Britain ===
From the Neolithic onwards the chalk downland of the area that would become Wessex was traversed by the Harrow Way, which can still be traced from Marazion in Cornwall to the coast of the English Channel near Dover, and was probably connected with the ancient tin trade. In the Late Neolithic, the ceremonial sites of Avebury and Stonehenge were completed on Salisbury Plain, but the final phase of Stonehenge was erected by the so-called "Wessex culture" of the Middle Bronze Age (c. 1600–1200 BC). The area has many other earthworks and erected stone monuments from the Neolithic and Early Bronze periods, including the Dorset Cursus, an earthwork 10 km (6 mi) long and 100 m (110 yd) wide, which was oriented to the midwinter sunset. Although agriculture and hunting were pursued during this long period, there is little archaeological evidence of human settlements. By the Iron Age, Celtic British tribes such as the Durotriges, Atrebates, Belgae and Dobunni occupied the future Wessex.

=== Roman Britain ===
Following the Roman conquest of Britain, from the 1st century AD, numerous country Roman villas with attached farms were established across Wessex, along with the important towns of Dorchester and Winchester (the ending -chester comes from Latin castra, "a military camp"). The Romans, or rather the Romano-British, built another major road that integrated Wessex, running eastwards from Exeter through Dorchester to Winchester and Silchester and on to London.

In the mid-4th century there were increasing raids on Roman Britain by peoples such as the Picts, Scottish people, Attacotti, and Franks, as well as the Saxons. In 367, these tribes simultaneously invaded Britain from the north, west and east. The invaders reportedly defeated or co-opted Roman forces in most parts of northern and western Britain. However, the Roman general Theodosius had recaptured most areas by the end of 368. In 380–1, Magnus Maximus defeated further raids. However, there was increasing internal conflict across the Roman Empire. During 383–4, in the context of the overthrow of Emperor Gratian, Maximus took most of the garrison from Britain to Gaul, where he was made Augustus of the West, ruling Britain, Gaul, Spain and Roman Africa. Following the death of Maximus in 388, Roman authority in Britain again declined. During the late 390s, Stilicho attempted to restore control, with a campaign against the Picti, but this was undermined in 401 when Stilicho transferred troops to the Continent to fight the Goths. Two subsequent Roman rulers of Britain were murdered. In 407, a Roman officer in Britain, Constantine III declared himself Augustus of the West, and left for Gaul, taking with him Roman troops. Finally, in 410, when Romano-British officials requested military assistance from Emperor Honorius, he told them to manage their own defences. Economic decline occurred after these events: circulation of Roman coins ended and the importation of items from the Roman Empire stopped.

=== Anglo-Saxon settlement ===
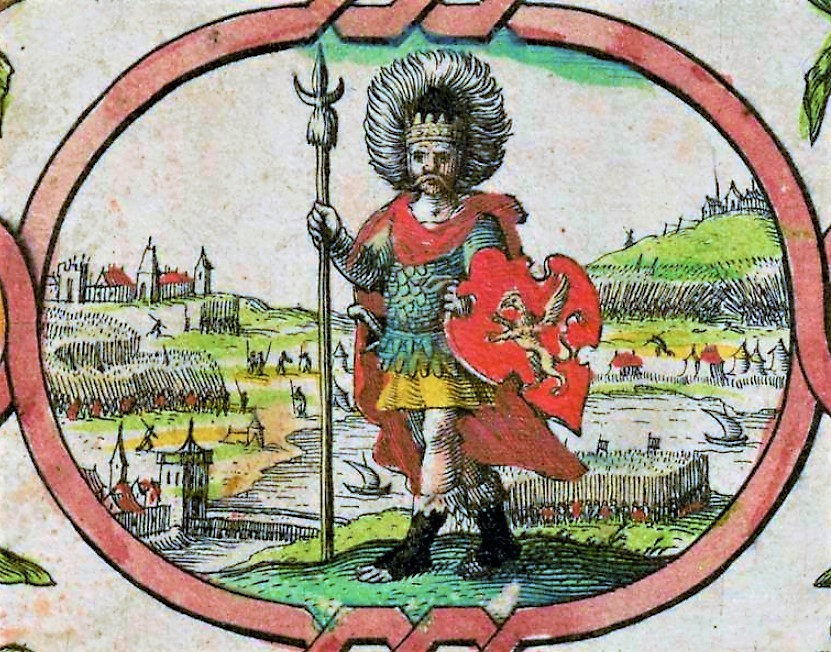
Imaginary depiction of Cerdic from John Speed's 1611 "Saxon Heptarchy"

Theories about the settlement of Saxons, Jutes and Angles in Britain are divided into two categories by the historian Peter Hunter Blair (1956), namely "Welsh" and "English".

==== The Welsh tradition ====
The Welsh tradition is exemplified by Gildas, in De Excidio et Conquestu Britanniae. In brief, it states that after the Romans left, the Celtic Britons managed to continue for a time without any major disruptions. However, when finally faced with northern invaders, a certain unnamed ruler in Britain (called "a proud tyrant" by Gildas) requested assistance from the Saxons in exchange for land.

There were no conflicts between the British and the Saxons for a time, but following "a dispute about the supply of provisions" the Saxons warred against the British and severely damaged parts of the country. In time, however, some Saxon troops left Britain; under Ambrosius Aurelianus, the British subsequently defeated those who remained.

A lengthy conflict ensued, in which neither side gained any decisive advantage until the Britons routed the Saxons at the Battle of Mons Badonicus. After this, there occurred a peaceful period for the Britons, under which Gildas was living at the time he wrote the De Excidio et Conquestu Britanniae.

==== The English tradition ====
One of the "English" traditions about the Saxon arrival concerns Hengest and Horsa. When Bede wrote his Ecclesiastical History of the English People, he adapted Gildas' narrative and added details, such as the names of those involved. To the "proud tyrant" he gave the name Vortigern, and the Saxon commanders he named Hengest and Horsa.

Further details were added to the story in the Historia Brittonum, which was partially written by Nennius. According to the Historia, Hengest and Horsa fought the invaders of Britain under the condition of gaining the Island of Thanet. The daughter of Hengest, Rowena, later arrived on a ship of reinforcements, and Vortigern married her.

However, a war arose in Kent due to a dispute between Hengest and Vortigern's son. After losing several battles, the Saxons finally defeated the British by treacherously attacking them once the two parties had convened for a meeting. Some additional details of the Hengest and Horsa legend are found in the Anglo-Saxon Chronicle. The Chronicle then records subsequent Saxon arrivals, including that of Cerdic, the founder of Wessex, in 495.

==== The Anglo-Saxon Chronicle ====
According to the Anglo-Saxon Chronicle, Cerdic of Wessex and his son Cynric of Wessex landed in southern Hampshire in 495, but this account is not regarded by historians as reliable due to duplication of Chronicle entries and evidence that the area was first occupied by Jutes. Although the entry mentions Cynric as Cerdic's son, a different source lists him as the son of Cerdic's son, Creoda of Wessex.

The Chronicle continues, stating that "Port, and his two sons Bieda and Mægla", landed at Portsmouth in 501 and killed a high-ranking British nobleman. In 508, Cerdic and Cynric slew British king Natanleod along with five thousand of his men (though the historicity of Natanleod has been disputed), and Cerdic became the first king of Wessex in 519.

The Saxons attacked Cerdicesford in 519, intending to cross the River Avon and block a road which connected Old Sarum and Badbury Rings, a British stronghold. The battle appears to have ended as a draw, and the expansion of Wessex ended for about thirty years. This is likely due to losses suffered during the battle and an apparent peace agreement with the Britons.

The battle of Mons Badonicus is believed to have been fought around this time. Gildas states that the Saxons were completely defeated in the battle, in which King Arthur participated according to Nennius. This defeat is not recorded in the Chronicle. The thirty-year period of peace was temporarily interrupted when, according to the Chronicle, the Saxons conquered the Isle of Wight in 530 at a battle near Carisbrooke.

Cynric became the ruler of Wessex after Cerdic died in 534, and reigned for twenty-six years. The sources do agree that Ceawlin, who succeeded Cynric in about 581, is the son of Cynric; he usually is named as the father of Cuthwine. Ceawlin's reign is thought to be more reliably documented than those of his predecessors, though the Chronicle's dates of 560 to 592 are different from the revised chronology. Ceawlin overcame pockets of resisting Britons to the northeast, in the Chilterns, Gloucestershire and Somerset. The capture of Cirencester, Gloucester and Bath in 577, after the pause caused by the battle of Mons Badonicus, opened the way to the southwest.

Ceawlin is one of the seven kings named in Bede's Ecclesiastical History of the English People as holding "imperium" over the southern English: the Chronicle later repeated this claim, referring to Ceawlin as a bretwalda, or "Britain-ruler". Ceawlin was deposed, perhaps by his nephew, Ceol, and died a year later.

Six years later, in about 594, Ceol was succeeded by a brother, Ceolwulf, who was succeeded in his turn in about 617 by Cynegils of Wessex. The genealogies do not agree on Cynegils' pedigree: his father is variously given as Ceola, Ceolwulf, Ceol, Cuthwine, Cutha or Cuthwulf.

The tradition embodied in the Anglo-Saxon Chronicle, and in the genealogies of the West Saxon dynasty, is open to considerable doubt. This is largely because the founder of the dynasty and a number of his alleged descendants had Brittonic Celtic, rather than Anglo-Saxon Germanic, names. The name Cerdic is derived from the British name Caraticos. This may indicate that Cerdic was a native Briton, and that his dynasty became anglicised over time. Other members of the dynasty possessing Celtic names include Ceawlin and Cædwalla. Cædwalla, who died as late as 689, was the last West Saxon king to possess a Celtic name.

=== Christianisation of Wessex ===
The Celtic and Anglo-Saxon kingdoms in around 600

Cynegils' reign saw the first event in West Saxon history that can be dated with reasonable certainty: the baptism of Cynegils by Birinus, at the end of the 630s, perhaps in 640. Birinus was then established as bishop of the West Saxons, with his seat at Dorchester-on-Thames. This was the first conversion to Christianity by a West Saxon king, but it was not accompanied by the immediate conversion of all the West Saxons: Cynegils' successor (and probably his son), Cenwealh, who came to the throne in about 642, was a pagan at his accession. However, he too was baptised only a few years later and Wessex became firmly established as a Christian kingdom. Cynegils' godfather was King Oswald of Northumbria, and his conversion may have been connected with an alliance against King Penda of Mercia, who had previously attacked Wessex.

These attacks marked the beginning of sustained pressure from the expanding kingdom of Mercia. In time this would deprive Wessex of its territories north of the Thames and the (Bristol) Avon, encouraging the kingdom's reorientation southwards. Cenwealh married Penda's daughter, and when he repudiated her, Penda again invaded and drove him into exile for some time, perhaps three years. The dates are uncertain but it was probably in the late 640s or early 650s. He spent his exile in East Anglia, and was converted to Christianity there. After his return, Cenwealh faced further attacks from Penda's successor Wulfhere, but was able to expand West Saxon territory in Somerset at the expense of the Britons. He established a second bishopric at Winchester, while the one at Dorchester was soon abandoned as Mercian power pushed southwards.

After Cenwealh's death in 673, his widow, Seaxburh, held the throne for a year; she was followed by Æscwine, who was apparently descended from another brother of Ceawlin. This was one of several occasions when the kingship of Wessex is said to have passed to a remote branch of the royal family with an unbroken male line of descent from Cerdic; these claims may be genuine, or may reflect the spurious assertion of descent from Cerdic to legitimise a new dynasty. Æscwine's reign only lasted two years, and in 676 the throne passed back to the immediate family of Cenwealh with the accession of his brother Centwine of Wessex. Centwine is known to have fought and won battles against the Britons, but the details have not survived.

Centwine was succeeded by another supposed distant relative, Cædwalla, who claimed descent from Ceawlin. Cædwalla reigned for just two years, but achieved a dramatic expansion of the kingdom's power, conquering the kingdoms of Sussex, Kent and the Isle of Wight, although Kent regained its independence almost immediately and Sussex followed some years later. His reign ended in 688 when he abdicated and went on pilgrimage to Rome, where he was baptised by Pope Sergius I but died soon afterwards. Bokerley Dyke appears to have been fortified around this period, and the former Roman Road at Ackling Dyke blocked by the Britons to prevent the West Saxons' advance into Dorset. Evidence suggests that Dorset, north Hampshire, eastern Devon and southern Wiltshire were substantially under West Saxon control by the beginning of the reign of Cædwalla of Wessex in 685, but details of their conquest are unclear.

His successor was Ine, who also claimed to be a descendant of Cerdic through Ceawlin, but again through a long-separated line of descent. Ine was the most durable of the West Saxon kings, reigning for 38 years. He issued the oldest surviving English code of laws apart from those of the kingdom of Kent, and established a second West Saxon bishopric at Sherborne, covering the area west of Selwood Forest, which formed an important boundary between east and west Wessex. Near the end of his life he followed in Cædwalla's footsteps by abdicating and making a pilgrimage to Rome. The throne then passed to a series of other kings who claimed descent from Cerdic, but whose supposed genealogies and relationship to one another are unknown.

During the 8th century Wessex was overshadowed by Mercia, whose power was then at its height, and the West Saxon kings may at times have acknowledged Mercian overlordship. They were, however, able to avoid the more substantial control which Mercia exerted over smaller kingdoms. During this period Wessex continued its gradual advance to the west, overwhelming the British kingdom of Dumnonia (Devon). At this time Wessex took de facto control of much of Devon, although Britons retained a degree of independence in Devon until at least the 10th century. (William of Malmesbury claimed that the Britons and Saxons inhabited Exeter "as equals" until 927.) As a result of the Mercian conquest of the northern portion of its early territories in Gloucestershire and Oxfordshire, the Thames and the Avon now probably formed the northern boundary of Wessex, while its heartland lay in Hampshire, Wiltshire, Berkshire, Dorset and Somerset. The system of shires which was later to form the basis of local administration throughout England (and eventually Ireland, Wales and Scotland as well) originated in Wessex, and had been established by the mid-8th century.

=== Hegemony of Wessex and the Viking raids ===
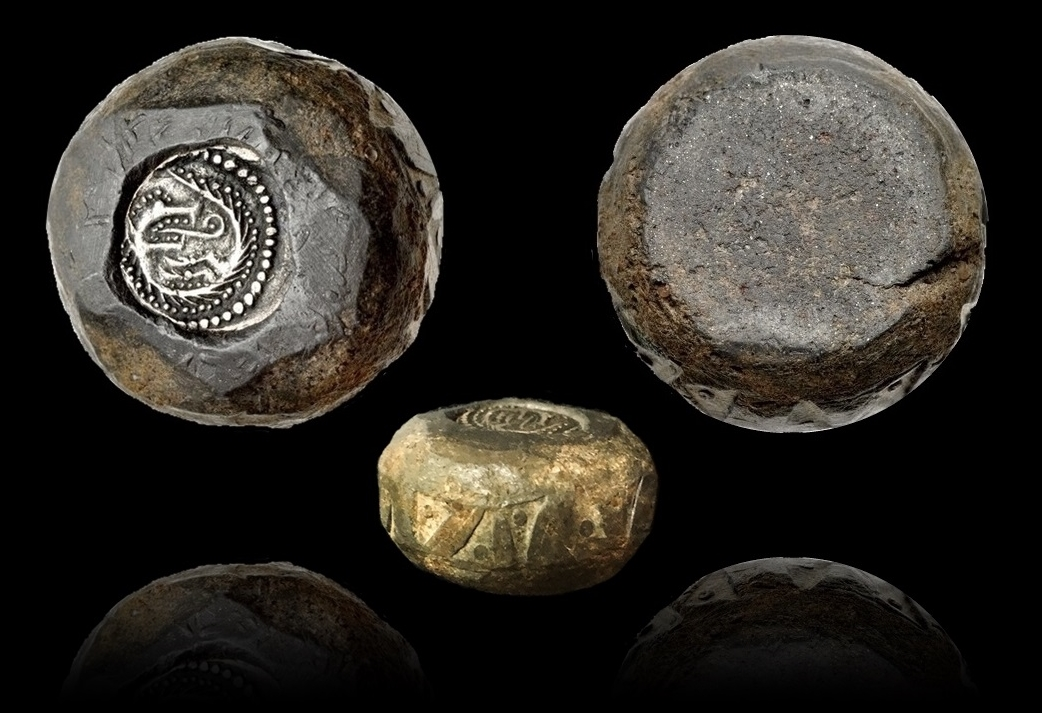
Anglo-Saxon–Viking coin weight, used for trading bullion and hacksilver. The material is lead and it weighs 36 g (1.3 oz). Embedded with an Anglo-Saxon sceat (Series K type 32a) dating to 720–750 and minted in Kent. It is edged in a dotted triangle pattern. Its origin is the Danelaw region and dates to 870–930

In 802 the fortunes of Wessex were transformed by the accession of Egbert who came from a cadet branch of the ruling dynasty that claimed descent from Ine's brother Ingild. With his accession the throne became firmly established in the hands of a single lineage. Early in his reign he conducted two campaigns against the "West Welsh", first in 813 and then again at Gafulford in 825. During the course of these campaigns he conquered the western Britons still in Devon and reduced those beyond the River Tamar, now Cornwall, to the status of a vassal. In 825 or 826 he overturned the political order of England by decisively defeating King Beornwulf of Mercia at Ellendun and seizing control of Surrey, Sussex, Kent and Essex from the Mercians, while with his help East Anglia broke away from Mercian control. In 829 he conquered Mercia, driving its King Wiglaf into exile, and secured acknowledgement of his overlordship from the king of Northumbria. He thereby became the Bretwalda, or high king of Britain. This position of dominance was short-lived, as Wiglaf returned and restored Mercian independence in 830, but the expansion of Wessex across south-eastern England proved permanent.

Egbert's later years saw the beginning of Danish Viking raids on Wessex, which occurred frequently from 835 onwards. In 851 a huge Danish army, said to have been carried on 350 ships, arrived in the Thames estuary. Having defeated King Beorhtwulf of Mercia in battle, the Danes moved on to invade Wessex, but were decisively crushed by Egbert's son and successor King Æthelwulf in the exceptionally bloody Battle of Aclea. This victory postponed Danish conquests in England for fifteen years, but raids on Wessex continued.

In 855–856 Æthelwulf went on pilgrimage to Rome and his eldest surviving son Æthelbald took advantage of his absence to seize his father's throne. On his return, Æthelwulf agreed to divide the kingdom with his son to avoid bloodshed, ruling the new territories in the east while Æthelbald held the old heartland in the west. Æthelwulf was succeeded by each of his four surviving sons ruling one after another: the rebellious Æthelbald, then Æthelbert, who had previously inherited the eastern territories from his father and who reunited the kingdom on Æthelbald's death, then Æthelred, and finally Alfred the Great. This occurred because the first two brothers died in wars with the Danes without issue, while Æthelred's sons were too young to rule when their father died.

=== Last English kingdom ===
England in the late 9th century

In 865, several of the Danish commanders combined their respective forces into one large army and landed in England. Over the following years, what became known as the Great Heathen Army overwhelmed the kingdoms of Northumbria and East Anglia. Then in 871, the Great Summer Army arrived from Scandinavia, to reinforce the Great Heathen Army. The reinforced army invaded Wessex and, although Æthelred and Alfred won some victories and succeeded in preventing the conquest of their kingdom, a number of defeats and heavy losses of men compelled Alfred to pay the Danes to leave Wessex. The Danes spent the next few years subduing Mercia and some of them settled in Northumbria, but the rest returned to Wessex in 876. Alfred responded effectively and was able with little fighting to bring about their withdrawal in 877. A portion of the Danish army settled in Mercia, but at the beginning of 878 the remaining Danes mounted a winter invasion of Wessex, taking Alfred by surprise and overrunning much of the kingdom. Alfred was reduced to taking refuge with a small band of followers in the marshes of the Somerset Levels, but after a few months he was able to gather an army and defeated the Danes at the Battle of Edington, bringing about their final withdrawal from Wessex to settle in East Anglia. There were simultaneous Danish raids on the north coast of France and Brittany in the 870s – prior to the establishment of Normandy in 911 – and recorded Danish alliances with both Bretons and Cornish may have resulted in the suppression of Cornish autonomy with the death by drowning of King Donyarth in 875 as recorded by the Annales Cambriae. No subsequent 'Kings' of Cornwall are recorded after this time, but Asser records Cornwall as a separate kingdom from Wessex in the 890s.

In 879 a Viking fleet that had assembled in the Thames estuary sailed across the English Channel to start a new campaign on the continent. The rampaging Viking army on the continent encouraged Alfred to protect his Kingdom of Wessex. Over the following years Alfred carried out a dramatic reorganisation of the government and defences of Wessex, building warships, organising the army into two shifts which served alternately, and establishing a system of fortified burhs across the kingdom. This system is recorded in a 10th-century document known as the Burghal Hidage, which details the location and garrisoning requirements of thirty-three forts, whose positioning ensured that no one in Wessex was more than a long day's ride from a place of safety. In the 890s these reforms helped him to repel the invasion of another huge Danish army – which was aided by the Danes settled in England – with minimal losses.

In 2015, two individuals found a large hoard near Leominster consisting primarily of Saxon jewellery and silver ingots but also coins; the latter date to around 879 CE. According to a news report, "experts believe it [the hoard] was buried by a Viking during a series of raids known to have taken place in the area at that time", while Wessex was ruled by Alfred the Great and Mercia by Ceolwulf II. Two imperial coins recovered from the treasure hunters depict the two kings, "indicating an alliance between the two kingdoms—at least, for a time—that was previously unknown to historians", according to the report. A report by The Guardian adds that

"The presence of both kings on the two emperor coins suggests some sort of pact between the pair. But the rarity of the coins also suggests that Alfred quickly dropped his ally, who was just about written out of history".

Alfred also reformed the administration of justice, issued a new law code and championed a revival of scholarship and education. He gathered scholars from around England and Europe to his court, and with their help translated a range of Latin texts into English, doing much of the work personally, and orchestrated the composition of the Anglo-Saxon Chronicle. As a result of these literary efforts and the political dominance of Wessex, the West Saxon dialect of this period became the standard written form of Old English for the rest of the Anglo-Saxon period and beyond.

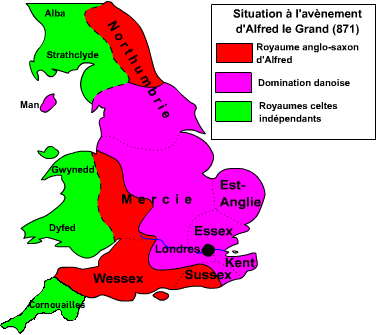
Wessex and areas under its control in 871.

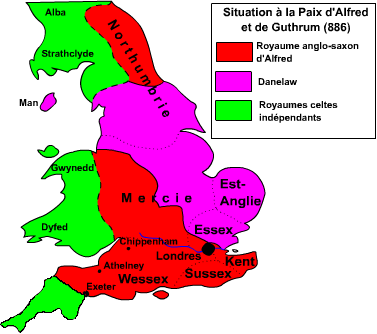
Wessex and areas under its control in 886.

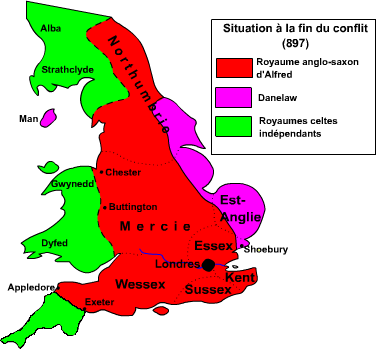
Wessex and areas under its control in 897.

The Danish conquests had destroyed the kingdoms of Northumbria and East Anglia and divided Mercia in half, with the Danes settling in the north-east while the south-west was left to the English king Ceolwulf, allegedly a Danish puppet. When Ceolwulf's rule came to an end he was succeeded as ruler of "English Mercia" not by another king but by a mere ealdorman, Aethelred, who acknowledged Alfred's overlordship and married his daughter Ethelfleda. The process by which this transformation of the status of Mercia took place is unknown, but it left Alfred as the only remaining English king.

=== Unification of England; Earldom of Wessex ===
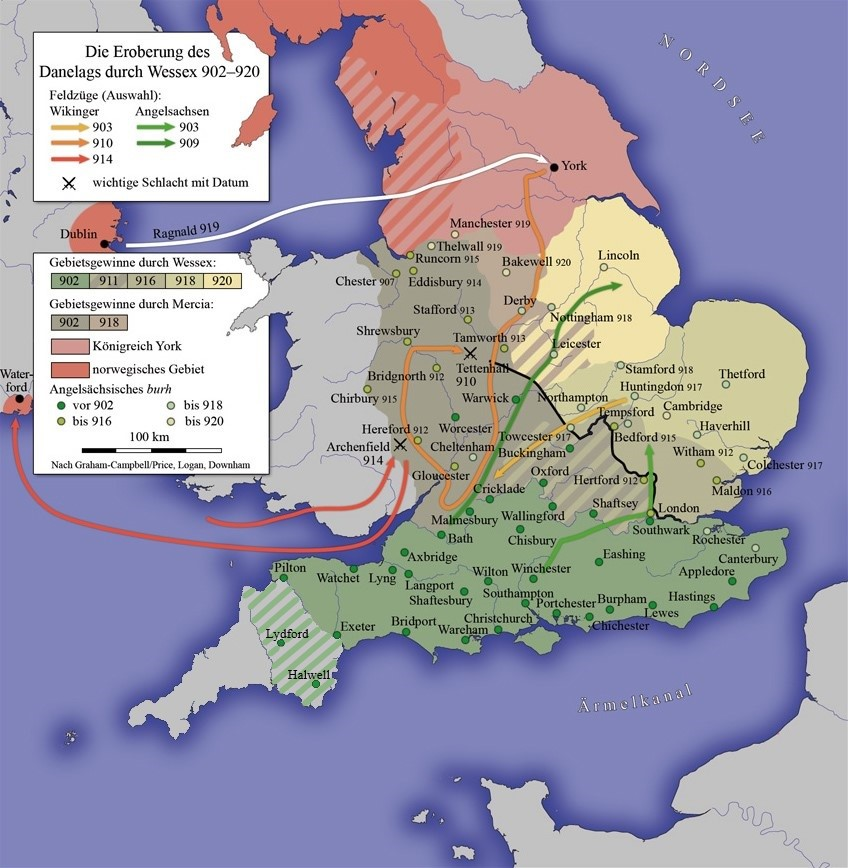
Unification of England and Defeat of the Danelaw in the 10th century under Wessex.

After the invasions of the 890s, Wessex and English Mercia continued to be attacked by the Danish settlers in England, and by small Danish raiding forces from overseas, but these incursions were usually defeated, while there were no further major invasions from the continent. The balance of power tipped steadily in favour of the English. In 911 Ealdorman Æthelred died, leaving his widow, Alfred's daughter Æthelflæd, in charge of Mercia. Alfred's son and successor Edward the Elder then annexed London, Oxford and the surrounding area, probably including Middlesex, Hertfordshire, Buckinghamshire and Oxfordshire, from Mercia to Wessex. Between 913 and 918 a series of English offensives overwhelmed the Danes of Mercia and East Anglia, bringing all of England south of the Humber under Edward's power. In 918 Æthelflæd died and Edward took over direct control of Mercia, extinguishing what remained of its independence and ensuring that henceforth there would be only one Kingdom of the English. In 927 Edward's successor Æthelstan conquered Northumbria, bringing the whole of England under one ruler for the first time. The Kingdom of Wessex had thus been transformed into the Kingdom of England.

Æthelstan never married, and when he died in 939 he was succeeded by his half-brother Edmund. Edmund's sons were young children when he died in 946, so he was succeeded by his full brother Eadred. Edmund and Eadred both lost control of Northumbria at the beginning of their reigns but had regained it by their deaths. Northumbria's acceptance of West Saxon rule in 954 meant the final unification of the kingdom of England. When Eadred died in 955, he was succeeded by Edmund's elder son Eadred, whose incompetent rule may have led to the division of England between Wessex under Eadred and Mercia and Northumbria under his younger brother Edgar in 957, although some historians argue that it was intended from the start that the kingdom would be divided when Edgar came of age, which occurred in 957. Eadwig died in 959 and Edgar became king of the whole of England.

After the conquest of England by the Danish king Cnut in 1016, he established earldoms based on the former kingdoms of Northumbria, Mercia and East Anglia, but initially administered Wessex personally. Within a few years, however, he had created an earldom of Wessex, encompassing all of England south of the Thames, for his English henchman Godwin, Earl of Wessex. For almost fifty years the vastly wealthy holders of this earldom, first Godwin and then his son Harold Godwinson, were the most powerful men in English politics after the king. Finally, on the death of Edward the Confessor in 1066, Harold became king, reuniting the earldom of Wessex with the crown. No new earl was appointed before the ensuing Norman Conquest of England, and as the Norman kings soon did away with the great earldoms of the late Anglo-Saxon period, 1066 marks the extinction of Wessex as a political unit.

== Symbols ==
=== Wyvern or dragon ===
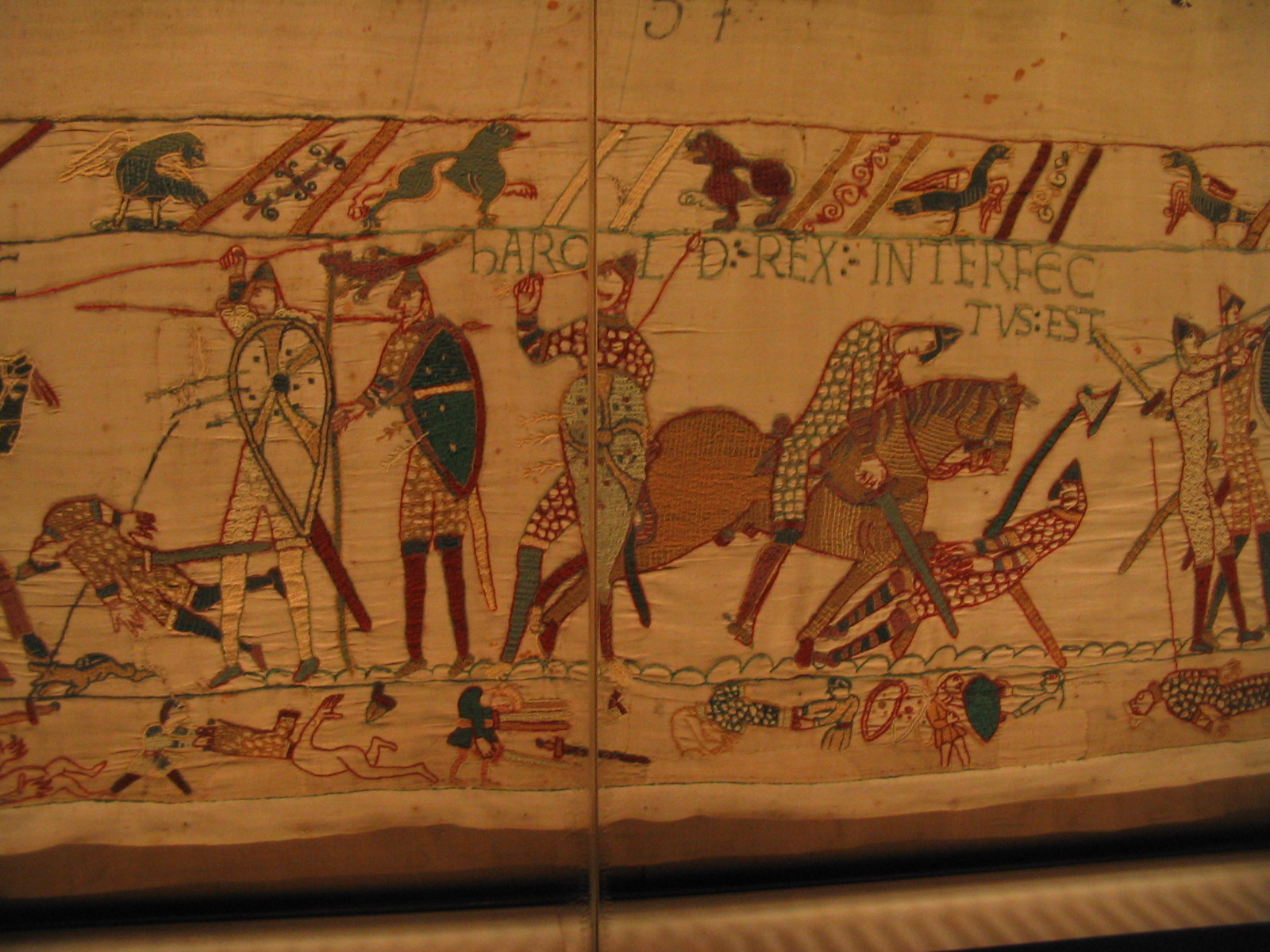
The Bayeux Tapestry, depicting the death of Harold II, 14 October 1066. His "Wyvern Standard" can be clearly seen at the left side.

Wessex is often symbolised by a wyvern or dragon.

Both Henry of Huntingdon and Matthew of Westminster talk of a golden dragon being raised at the Battle of Burford in 752 by the West Saxons. The Bayeux Tapestry depicts a fallen golden dragon, as well as a red/golden/white dragon at the death of King Harold II, who was previously Earl of Wessex. Dragon standards were in fairly wide use in Europe at the time, being derived from the draco standard employed by the later Roman army, and there is no evidence that it explicitly identified Wessex.

A panel of 18th century stained glass at Exeter Cathedral indicates that an association with an image of a dragon in south west Britain pre-dated the Victorians. Nevertheless, the association with Wessex was only popularised in the 19th century, most notably through the writings of E. A. Freeman. By the time of the grant of armorial bearings by the College of Arms to Somerset County Council in 1911, a (red) dragon had become the accepted heraldic emblem of the former kingdom. This precedent was followed in 1937 when Wiltshire County Council was granted arms. Two gold Wessex dragons were later granted as supporters to the arms of Dorset County Council in 1950.

Wessex Division Formation patch

In the British Army the wyvern has been used to represent Wessex: the 43rd (Wessex) Infantry Division, and postwar regional 43 (Wessex) Brigade adopted a formation sign consisting of a gold wyvern on a black or dark blue background. The regular Wessex Brigade of the 1960s adopted a cap badge featuring the heraldic beast, until the regiments took back up individual regimental badges in the late 1960s. The Territorial Army Wessex Regiment continued to wear the Wessex Brigade badge until the late 1980s when its individual companies too readopted their parent regular regimental cap badges. The now disbanded West Somerset Yeomanry adopted a Wessex Wyvern rampant as the centre piece for its cap badge, and the current Royal Wessex Yeomanry adopted a similar device in 2014 when the Regiment moved from wearing individual squadron county yeomanry cap badges to a unified single Regimental cap badge.

When Sophie, Duchess of Edinburgh was granted arms, the sinister supporter assigned was a blue wyvern, described by the College of Arms as "an heraldic beast which has long been associated with Wessex".

Crampton's 1970s flag, designed for the modern Wessex region.

In the 1970s William Crampton, the founder of the British Flag Institute, designed a flag for the Wessex region that depicts a gold wyvern on a red field.

=== Cross of Saint Aldhelm ===
Flag attributed to Saint Aldhelm

Coat of arms attributed to Kings of Wessex

A white cross on a field of red, known as the Flag of Saint Aldhelm (whose feast day on 25 May is also celebrated as "Wessex Day") is sometimes flown by Wessex regionalists as an alternative to the Wyvern. The flag is effectively an inverted version of the Cross of Saint George, although it is also thought to have been derived from the arms of Sherborne Abbey, Dorset.

=== Attributed coat of arms ===
A coat of arms was attributed by medieval heralds to the Kings of Wessex. These arms appear in a manuscript of the 13th century, and are blazoned as Azure, a cross patoncé (alternatively a cross fleury or cross moline) between four martlets Or.

The attributed arms of Wessex are also known as the "Arms of Edward the Confessor", and the design is based on an emblem historically used by King Edward the Confessor on the reverse side of pennies minted by him. The heraldic design continued to represent both Wessex and Edward in classical heraldry and is found on a number of church windows in derived shields such as the Arms of the Collegiate Church of St Peter at Westminster (Westminster Abbey, which was founded by the king).

== Cultural and political identity in modern times ==
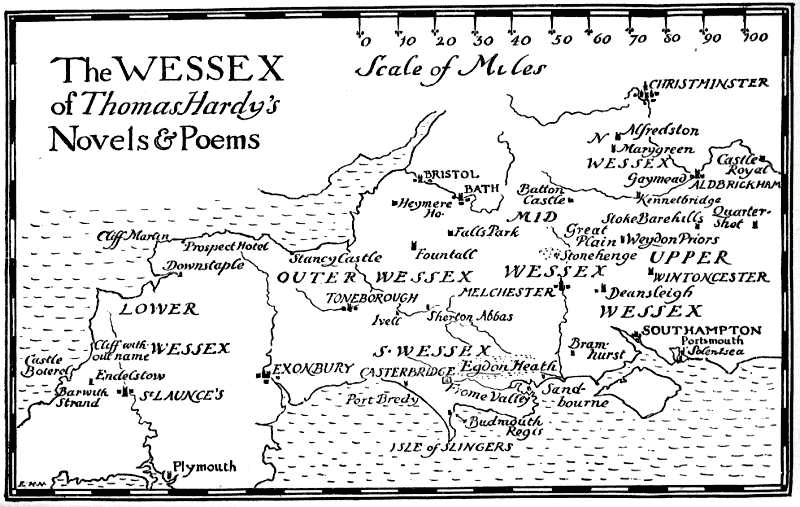
Map of Thomas Hardy's Wessex

Thomas Hardy used a fictionalised Wessex as a setting for many of his novels, adopting his friend William Barnes' term Wessex for their home county of Dorset and its neighbouring counties in the south and west of England.

In the book and television series The Last Kingdom, Wessex is the primary setting, focusing on the rule of Alfred the Great and the war against the Vikings.

Wessex remains a common term for the area. Many organisations that cover the area of Dorset, Somerset, Hampshire, and Wiltshire use the name Wessex in their company or organisation name; for example Wessex Bus, Wessex Water, and Wessex Institute of Technology. The Wessex Constitutional Convention and Wessex Regionalists (political party) are minor groups seeking increased political autonomy for the region. A number of British Army units also use the name Wessex, such as the Wessex Regiment, and 32nd Regiment Royal Artillery – known as the 'Wessex Gunners'.

In 2023, Dorset Council proposed to form a devolved authority named "Heart of Wessex" with Bournemouth, Christchurch and Poole, Somerset, North Somerset and Wiltshire councils.

== See also ==
- Heptarchy
- Earl of Wessex
- List of monarchs of Wessex

== Bibliography ==
- Hunter Blair, Peter; Keynes, Simon (2006). An introduction to Anglo-Saxon England (3. ed., repr ed.). Cambridge: Cambridge Univ. Press. ISBN 978-0-521-53777-3.
- Keynes, Simon (1998). "Alfred and the Mercians". In Blackburn, Mark A.S.; Dumville, David N. (eds.). Kings, currency, and alliances: history and coinage of southern England in the ninth century. Woodbridge: Boydell & Brewer. pp. 1–46. ISBN 978-0-8511-5598-2.
- Keynes, Simon (2014) [1st edition 1999]. "Appendix I: Rulers of the English, c. 450–1066". In Lapidge, Michael; Blair, John; Keynes, Simon; Scragg, Donald (eds.). The Wiley Blackwell Encyclopedia of Anglo-Saxon England (Second ed.). Chichester, West Sussex: Wiley Blackwell. pp. 521–538. ISBN 978-0-4706-5632-7.
- Yorke, Barbara (1995). Wessex in the Early Middle Ages. A&C Black. ISBN 978-0-7185-1856-1.
