= Bretwalda =

Title given to some Anglo-Saxon rulers

Bretwalda is an Old English term, of contested etymology, applied to some of the rulers of Anglo-Saxon kingdoms from the 5th century onwards. It appears to denote a degree of overlordship over other Anglo-Saxon kingdoms, although the extent of this power, and its "official" nature, is unclear.

== Etymology ==
The second element of the name is taken to mean "ruler" or "sovereign". The first, however, is more controversial, and two possibilities have been proposed:

- The Old English adjective bryten ("broad", from the verb breotan meaning "to break" or "to disperse"), found in compounds such as bryten-rice ("kingdom"), bryten-grund ("the wide expanse of the earth") and bryten-cyning ("king whose authority was widely extended").
- From Bryten or Breoten, the Old English name of Britain.

== Bede ==
Bede's Ecclesiastical History of the English People, completed in 731, is the first surviving text to allude to the notion of overlordship among the Anglo-Saxon kings. His account of the death of King Æthelberht of Kent, in the year 616, notes:

He [Æthelberht] was the third English king to rule over all the southern kingdoms, which are divided from the north by the river Humber and the surrounding territory; but he was the first to enter the kingdom of heaven. The first king to hold the like sovereignty was Ælle, king of the South Saxons; the second was Cælin, king of the West Saxons, known in their own language as Ceawlin; the third, as we have said, was Æthelberht, king of Kent; the fourth was Rædwald, king of the East Angles, who even during the lifetime of Æthelberht was gaining the leadership for his own race; the fifth was Edwin, king of the Northumbrians, the nation inhabiting the district north of the Humber. Edwin had still greater power and ruled over all the inhabitants of Britain, English and Britons alike, except for Kent only. He even brought under English rule the Mevanian Islands (Anglesey and Man) which lie between England and Ireland and belong to the Britons. The sixth to rule within the same bounds was Oswald, the most Christian king of the Northumbrians, while the seventh was his brother Oswiu who for a time held almost the same territory. The latter overwhelmed and made tributary even the tribes of the Picts and Irish who inhabit the northern parts of Britain; but of this more later.

— Bede, Ecclesiastical History of the English People

Despite introducing the idea of the "overking", Bede never employs the Old English term bretwalda. Instead, his Latin text alludes to those holding imperium over other Anglo-Saxon kingdoms.

Mercia was arguably the most powerful Anglo-Saxon kingdom for much of the late 7th though 8th centuries, yet the Mercian kings are absent from Bede's list. For Bede, Mercia was a traditional enemy of his native Northumbria and he regarded powerful kings such as the pagan Penda as standing in the way of the Christian conversion of the Anglo-Saxons.

== The Anglo-Saxon Chronicle ==
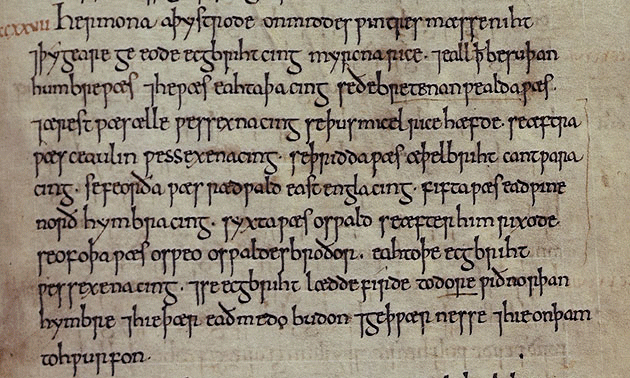
The entry for 827 (recte 829) in manuscript C of the Anglo-Saxon Chronicle, which lists the eight bretwaldas (shown as bretenanwealda in this manuscript)

The only contemporary use of the term bretwalda is in manuscript A of the Anglo-Saxon Chronicle for 827 (recte 829). Manuscript A is a recension of the original "common stock" of the 890s, and in the view of the historian Sarah Foot bretwalda is unlikely to have been the original spelling. Other manuscripts of the Chronicle used similar terms such as brytenwuldu and bretenanwealda in the entry for 829.

This entry in the Anglo-Saxon Chronicle records the conquest of Mercia by Ecgberht, King of Wessex, making him king of all England south of the Humber. Ecgberht is described as the eighth bretwalda, ruler of Britain, and the eight are listed with descriptions:

- Ælle, king of the South Saxons
- Ceawlin, king of the West Saxons
- Æthelberht, king of the people of Kent
- Rædwald, king of the East Angles
- Edwin, king of the people of Northumbria
- Oswald, Edwin's successor
- Oswiu, Oswald's brother
- Ecgberht, king of the West Saxons

The Chronicle mirrors the list provided by Bede, with the addition of Ecgberht's name. Much like Bede, the Chronicle omits the Mercian kings, most notably Offa, from its list, likely a result of the West Saxon text's anti-Mercian bias. The Annals of Wales continued to recognise the kings of Northumbria as "Kings of the Saxons" until the death of Osred I of Northumbria in 716.

The term bretwalda is also used in some spurious documents from the period.

== Modern interpretation ==
The Anglo-Saxon kingdoms

For some time, the existence of the word bretwalda in the Anglo-Saxon Chronicle, which was based in part on the list given by Bede in his Historia Ecclesiastica, led historians to think that there was perhaps a "title" held by Anglo-Saxon overlords. This was particularly attractive as it would lay the foundations for the establishment of an English monarchy. The 20th-century historian Frank Stenton said of the Anglo-Saxon chronicler that "his inaccuracy is more than compensated by his preservation of the English title applied to these outstanding kings". He argued that the term bretwalda "falls into line with the other evidence which points to the Germanic origin of the earliest English institutions".

It is certainly clear, that a complex array of dominance and subservience existed during the Anglo-Saxon period. A king who used charters to grant land in another kingdom indicated such a relationship. If the other kingdom were fairly large, as when the Mercians dominated the East Anglians, the relationship would have been more equal than in the case of the Mercian dominance of the Hwicce, which was a comparatively small kingdom.

However, over the later 20th century, this assumption was increasingly challenged. The historian Simon Keynes comments:

Bede's list is best understood as the product of personal reflection on his part. It is likely, in the same way, that the chronicler's use of the term bretwalda did not represent Ecgberht's succession to a recognised office, with powers and responsibilities particular to itself, but rather a flight of fancy, important to the chronicler but of no real importance in the unfolding course of political development.

Patrick Wormald interpreted it as "less an objectively realized office than a subjectively perceived status" and emphasised the partiality of its usage in favour of Southumbrian rulers. In 1991, Steven Fanning argued that "it is unlikely that the term ever existed as a title or was in common usage in Anglo-Saxon England". The fact that Bede never mentioned a special title for the kings in his list implies that he was unaware of one. In 1995, Simon Keynes observed that "if Bede's concept of the Southumbrian overlord, and the chronicler's concept of the 'Bretwalda', are to be regarded as artificial constructs, which have no validity outside the context of the literary works in which they appear, we are released from the assumptions about political development which they seem to involve [...] we might ask whether kings in the eighth and ninth centuries were quite so obsessed with the establishment of a pan-Southumbrian state".
