= West Saxon Genealogical Regnal List =

List of West-Saxon kings

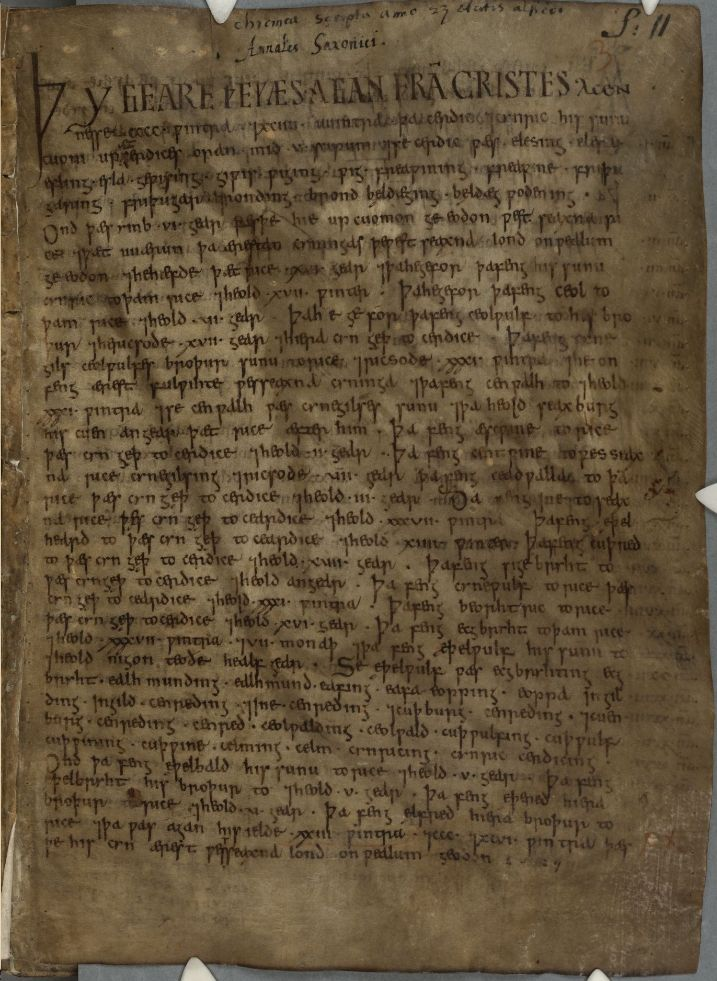
The West Saxon Genealogical Regnal List on folio 1r of Cambridge Corpus Christi College MS 173 (also known as the Parker Chronicle).

The West Saxon Genealogical Regnal List (also known as the West Saxon Regnal Table, West Saxon Regnal List, and Genealogical Preface to the Anglo-Saxon Chronicle) is the name given in modern scholarship to a list of West-Saxon kings (which has no title in its medieval manuscripts, and is not strictly a genealogy). It is one of the main sources for understanding the early history of Wessex and the attempts of its dynasties (at the time of Alfred the Great and possibly before) to project an image of dynastic stability.

== Content ==
The List begins with Cerdic (claiming that he arrived in Wessex in 494) and extends to Alfred (r. 871–99). Thus the list probably took its surviving form during Alfred's reign. The list generally simply gives the reign-length of each king and names his successor, sometimes adding extra information about each king's genealogy and especially his ultimate descent from Cerdic; Æthelwulf, Alfred's father, is given an especially full statement of pedigree. The List also notes that its sixth ruler, Cynegils, was the first of the West-Saxon kings to receive baptism.

As edited by David Dumville, the List begins:

Ða wæs agangen fram Cristes acennednysse .cccc. ⁊ .xciiii. wintra þa Cerdic ⁊ Cynric his sunu coman upp æt Cerdicesoran mid fif scipum — ⁊ se Cerdic was Elesing, Elesa Gewising, Gewis Wiging, Wig Freawining, Freawine Freoþogaring, Freodogar Bronding, Brond Bældæging, Bældæg Wodening. þæs ymbe .vi. gear ðæs þe hi upp coman, hi geeodan Westseaxna rice ⁊ þæt wæron ða ærestan cyningas þe Westseaxena land on Wealum geeodan. ⁊ he hæfde þæt rice .xvi. gear. þa gefor he, þa feng Cynric his sunu to þam rice ⁊ heold .xxvii. wintra. þa he forðferde, þa feng Ceaulin his sunu to ⁊ heold .vii. gear.

When four hundred and ninety-four years had passed from the birth of Christ, Cerdic and his son Cynric landed at Cerdicesora with five ships — and that Cerdic was son of Elesa, Elesa of Gewis, Gewis of Wig, Wig of Freawine, Freawine of Freoþogar, Freoðogar of Brond, Brong of Bældæg, and Bældæg of Woden. Around six years after they landed, they occupied the kingdom of the West Saxons and they were the earliest kings to occupy the land of the West Saxons against the Romans. And he held that kingdom for sixteen years. When he passed, his son Cynric succeeded him, and held the kingdom for twenty-seven years. When he passed on, his son Ceaulin succeeded him, and held it for seven years.

== History and source-value ==
=== Origin of the surviving version of the List ===
The surviving manuscripts of the List are close copies of a text which scholars agree was compiled to promote the West-Saxon royal dynasty and its legitimacy. In the analysis of Susan Irvine, in the earliest manuscript of the Chronicle (Cambridge, Corpus Christi College, MS 173), the

genealogical and regnal list acts as a preface to this version of the Chronicle [...] Though the range of the Chronicle itself extends across the various Anglo-Saxon kingdoms, the West Saxon genealogical and regnal list with which it opens establishes the paramount importance of the dynasty springing from Cerdic. [...] The structural symmetry of the preface—the reference at both the beginning and end to the conquering of the land of the West Saxons from the Britons—emphasises that the West Saxon dynasty is to be seen as culminating in Alfred's reign.

Comparing stylistic traits of the genealogies in the West Saxon Genealogical Regnal List with its likely early source material (represented by the Anglian King-list), and with the genealogies in the "Common Stock" of the Anglo-Saxon Chronicle, Thomas A. Bredehoft showed that, when adding new genealogical material to their sources, the List and the Chronicle shared a literary style different from the Anglian King-list, and argued that one scholar was involved in editing both the West Saxon Genealogical Regnal List and the Chronicle, emphasising the idea that they were closely linked components of King Alfred the Great's image-crafting.

=== Reign-lengths in the earliest version of the List ===
Understanding how the List came to be compiled and from what sources has been central to evaluating it and the Anglo-Saxon Chronicle as sources for West-Saxon history before Alfred's reign. Several manuscripts of the List also contain a separate copy of the Anglo-Saxon Chronicle, but the body of the Chronicle itself evidently drew on an earlier version of the List, and Dumville showed that all these witnesses to the List diverge to some degree from what the earliest text of the List must have said. Through detailed textual criticism of all manuscripts of both the List and the Chronicle, he was able to reconstruct the likely archetype of the List and show how the surviving versions of the List and the Chronicle altered it. Dumville inferred that the archetype of the List gave the following reign-lengths down to Ine (after which there is little divergence):

king	reign inferred for archetype of the manuscripts of the Chronicle	reign inferred for the earliest version of the List (converting reign-lengths into years AD)
Cerdic	500–34 and 519–34	538–54
Cynric	534–60	554–81
Ceawlin	560–91	581–88
Ceol	591–97	588–94
Ceolwulf	597–611	594–611
Cynegils	611–42	611–42
Cenwealh	642–73	642–73
Seaxburh	673–74	673–74
Æscwine	674–76	674–76
Centwine	676–85	676–85
Ceadwalla	685–88	685–88
Ine	688–726	688–726

=== Source-value for the seventh century onwards ===
Dumville inferred that the earliest version of the List might have drawn on a list of West-Saxon kings in the Anglian king-list, adding regnal dates to that. (The West-Saxon section of the Anglian king-list reads: "Ine Cenreding; Cenred Ceolwalding; Ceolwald Cuþwulfing; Cuþwulf Cuþwining; Cuþwine Celing; Celin Cynricing; Cynric Creoding; Creoda Cerdicing; Cerdic Alucing; Aluca Giwising; Giwis Branding; Brand Bældæging; Bældæg Wodning; Woden Frealafing".) He also noted that "on the available evidence only the pre-christian period of West Saxon history presents severe chronological problems. That fact is itself suggestive both of an adequate means of transmission of chronological information (apparently without intentional manipulation of reign-lengths), from the first establishment of christian institutions". This suggests that the king list might reflect written records that started to be kept with the conversion of the West-Saxon kings around the 630s.

Whatever its source(s), Dumville inferred that contemporary records began to be added to an initial version of the List from around the reign of Ine (which concluded in 726), due to the growing detail and precision of dating in the List. The List offers even more precise information from the reign of Ecgberht (r. 802–39), so its information is even more certainly contemporary from that point.

=== Source-value for the sixth century ===
For the sixth century, however, the List and Chronicle are likely "a political fiction" designed to suggest "that a West Saxon monarchy of ninth-century type existed from the foundation of the kingdom, with one member of the Cerdicing dynasty following another in more or less lineal succession". Sixth-century West-Saxon political reality was more likely a mélange of competing petty kings. Although some or even all of the kings named in the List may have been real, their succession may not have been uninterrupted and their status not uniformly recognised. Since King Alfred and his brothers drew their legitimacy from descent from Cerdic, this agenda would fit, and might reflect, Alfred's late ninth-century political interests.

Dumville concluded that the regnal dates in the archetype of the List implicitly placed Cerdic's arrival in Britain not in 494, as stated in the Chronicle, but in 532, stating that "the earliest recoverable phase of West Saxon historiography indicates a view that West Saxon dynastic origins might be traced back to the 530s". He found the idea that the West Saxons first came under the dominance of a single dynasty around this time is plausible, since it is similar to the chronology of political developments elsewhere in England. On two subsequent occasions in copies of chronicles based on the archetype of the List, which subsequently became sources for the surviving Anglo-Saxon Chronicle, the beginning of this chronology was pushed back by nineteen years (a period of time corresponding to a Paschal cycle and therefore a natural unit of time to early medieval clerics), extending the foundation of the dynasty first from 538 to 519, and then to 500. It was these dislocations that produced two obviously duplicated entries for the West Saxon arrival in Wessex, with a gap of nineteen years, in the Chronicle: the 495 annal saying that (six years before the beginning of Cerdic's rule) Cerdic and Cynric arrived at Cerdicesora "⁊ þy ilcan dæge gefuhtun wiþ Walum" ("and they fought against the Romans that same day") and the 514 annal saying that the West Saxons arrived at Cerdicesora "⁊ fuhton wiþ Brettas ⁊ hie gefliemdon" ("and fought against the Britons and put them to flight"). The resulting gap between the beginning of the Cerdicing dynasty and the accurate regnal years of the seventh century was filled by extending the reign of Ceawlin from seven years to thirty-one, possibly because he alone of the List's seventh-century kings had the status of being mentioned by the prestigious historian Bede in his Ecclesiastical History of the English People.

These alterations to the length of the reigns in the archetype of the List were presumably made to put the beginning of the Cerdicing dynasty closer to what was believed to be the time of the Anglo-Saxon settlement of Britain and to compete with claims to dynastic antiquity in rival kingdoms.

== Influence ==
The Anno Domini dates given in the Anglo-Saxon Chronicle for sixth-century West-Saxon kings, and possibly many subsequent ones, seem to be based on (or, at times, adapted from) the earliest reconstructable version of the List (via lost, intermediary chronicles), and these dates are thought to have provided the framework into which the dates of battles said to be fought by those kings were fitted. The archetype of the List may even have inspired some dates of non-West Saxon dynasties in the Chronicle: Patrick Sims-Williams suggested that the thirty-three year reign that the Chronicle ascribes to Hengest and his son Oisc, the first kings of Kent, who supposedly reigned 455–88, was inspired by the thirty-four year reign ascribed to Cerdic (working alongside his son Cynric).

== Manuscripts ==
The primary manuscripts of the List (from which a few other medieval and post-medieval copies are known to descend) are:

Shelfmark	Date	Place	Sigla				Other key texts in manuscript
Shelfmark	Date	Place	Napier and Hackenberg	Dumville	Dictionary of Old English	Sparks, Windram, and Howe	Other key texts in manuscript
London, British Library, Add. 23211, fol. 1r (until 1997 1v)	c. 871 × 899	Wessex	S	N	KSB 2 (Sweet) B18.2	BL23	Computistical texts; Old English Martyrology
Cambridge, Corpus Christi College, 173, fol. 1r	C9/10	Wessex, possibly Winchester	P	P	ChronA (Bately) B17.1	C173	Anglo-Saxon Chronicle A
London, British Library, Add. 34652, fol. 2	mid-C10 and early C11	Winchester	A	Q	KSB 3 (Nap) B18.3	BL34	Anglo-Saxon Chronicle G
London, British Library, Cotton Tiberius A. iii, fol. 178	second half of C10, probably 977×79		T	T	KSB 4 (Dickins) B18.4	CTA3	Anglo-Saxon Chronicle B
Cambridge, University Library, Kk. 3. 18, fols. 3v-4r	second quarter of C11	Worcester	Ca	V	Bede 5 B9.6.7	ULK3	Ecclesiastical History of the English People
Cambridge, Corpus Christi College, 383, fol. 69v	C11/12	Probably London, St Paul's	J	W	KSB 1 (Dickins) B18.1	C383	Legal texts
Rochester, Cathedral Library, A.3.5, fols. 7v-8v.	c. 1123×25		T	T	KSB 7.1 (Ingram) B18.7.1	TR35	Legal texts and genealogies

Most or all of these are thought to be independent witnesses to the lost ninth-century archetype of the List.

== Editions ==
- David N. Dumville, 'The West Saxon Genealogical Regnal List: Manuscripts and Texts', Anglia: Zeitschrift für Englische Philologie, 104 (1986), 1–32

== See also ==
- List of monarchs of Wessex
