= Cerdic of Wessex =

King of Wessex from 519 to 534

Cerdic
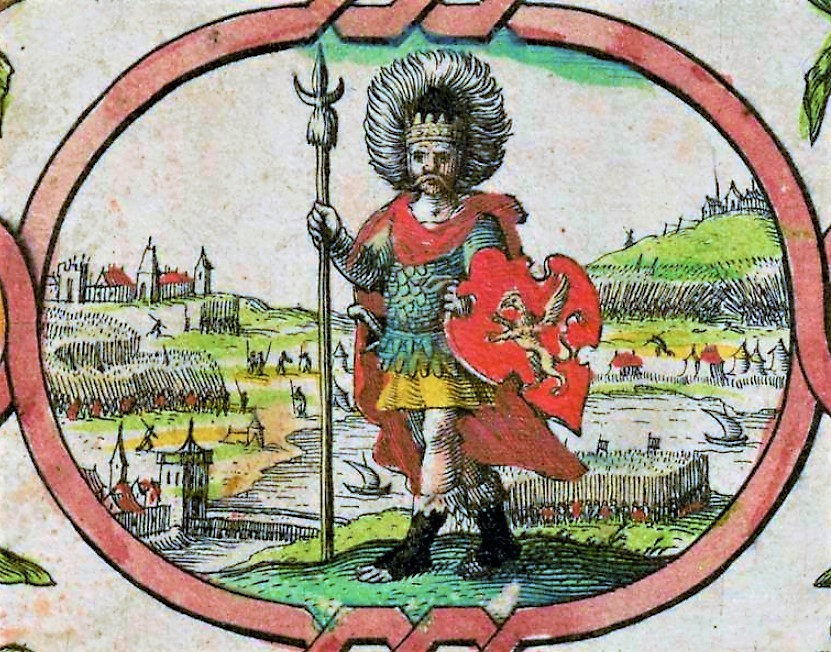
- Imaginary depiction from John Speed's 1611 "Saxon Heptarchy"

King of Wessex (King of the Gewissae)
- Reign: c. 519 - c. 534
- Predecessor: Title established
- Successor: Cynric or possibly Creoda
- Died: c. 534
- Issue: Cynric or possibly Creoda
- House: Wessex
- Father: Elesa

Cerdic (/ˈtʃɜːrdɪtʃ/ CHER-ditch; Latin: Cerdicus) is described in the Anglo-Saxon Chronicle as a leader of the Anglo-Saxon settlement of Britain, being the founder and first king of Wessex, reigning from around 519 to around 534 AD. Subsequent kings of Wessex were each claimed by the Chronicle to descend in some manner from Cerdic. His origin, ethnicity, and even his very existence have been extensively disputed. However, though claimed as the founder of Wessex by later West Saxon kings, he would have been known to contemporaries as king of the Gewissae, a folk or tribal group. In a charter dating to 686, Cædwalla was the first king of the Gewissae to call himself 'King of the West Saxons'.

== Etymology ==
The name Ċerdiċ is thought by most scholars to be Brittonic rather than Germanic in origin. According to the Brittonic origin hypothesis, Ċerdiċ is derived from the British name *Caratīcos or Corotīcos (whose Old Welsh form was Ceretic). This may indicate that Cerdic was a native Briton, and that his dynasty became Anglicised over time. This view is supported by the potentially non-Germanic names of some of his descendants including Ceawlin, Cedda and Cædwalla.

== Background ==
=== Ancestry ===
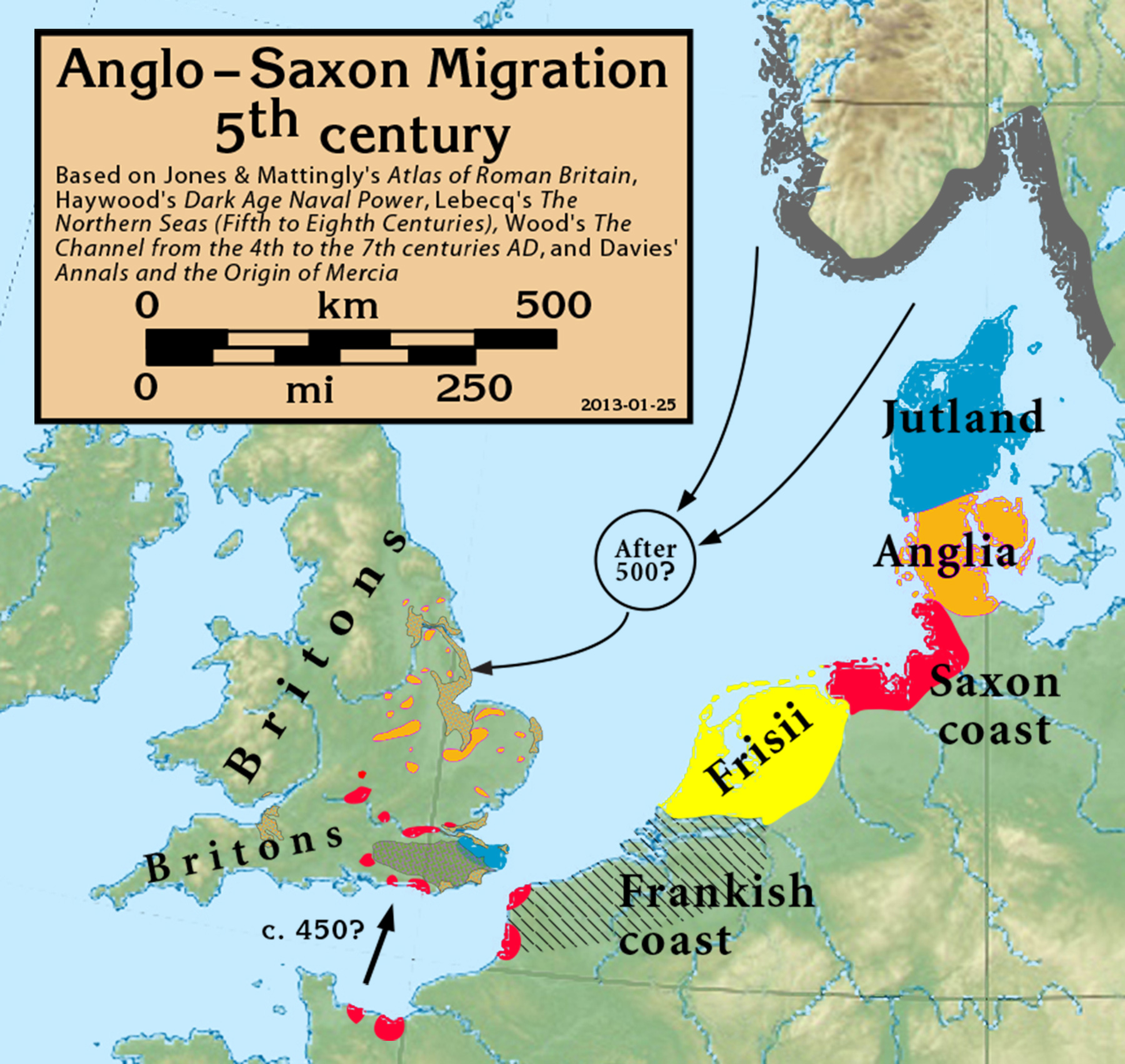

The Anglo-Saxon Chronicle provides a pedigree tracing Cerdic's ancestry back to Woden and the antediluvian patriarchs. Kenneth Sisam has shown that this pedigree was constructed by borrowing and subsequently modifying a pedigree tracing the ancestry of the kings of Bernicia, and hence before the generation of Cerdic himself the Wessex pedigree has no historical basis. The pedigree gives Cerdic's father as Elesa, who has been identified by some twentieth-century scholars with the Romano-Briton Elafius, the "chief of the region", met by Germanus of Auxerre. But Elafius's own historicity is in doubt, and twenty-first-century researchers reject his identification with Elesa as fanciful.

=== Social status ===
J. N. L. Myres noted that when Cerdic and Cynric first appear in the Anglo-Saxon Chronicle under the year 495 they are described as ealdormen, which at that point in time was a fairly junior rank. Myres remarks that:

It is thus odd to find it used here to describe the leaders of what purports to be an independent band of invaders, whose origins and authority are not otherwise specified. It looks very much as if a hint is being conveyed that Cerdic and his people owed their standing to having been already concerned with administrative affairs under Roman authority on this part of the Saxon Shore.

Furthermore, it is not until 519 that Cerdic and Cynric are recorded as "beginning to reign", suggesting that they ceased being dependent vassals or ealdormen and became independent kings in their own right.

Summing up, Myres believed that:

It is thus possible ... to think of Cerdic as the head of a partly British noble family with extensive territorial interests at the western end of the Litus Saxonicum. As such he may well have been entrusted in the last days of Roman, or sub-Roman authority with its defence. He would then be what in later Anglo-Saxon terminology could be described as an ealdorman ... If such a dominant native family as that of Cerdic had already developed blood-relationships with existing Saxon and Jutish settlers at this end of the Saxon Shore, it could very well be tempted, once effective Roman authority had faded, to go further. It might have taken matters into its own hands and after eliminating any surviving pockets of resistance by competing British chieftains, such as the mysterious Natanleod of annal 508, it could "begin to reign" without recognizing in future any superior authority.

== King of Wessex ==
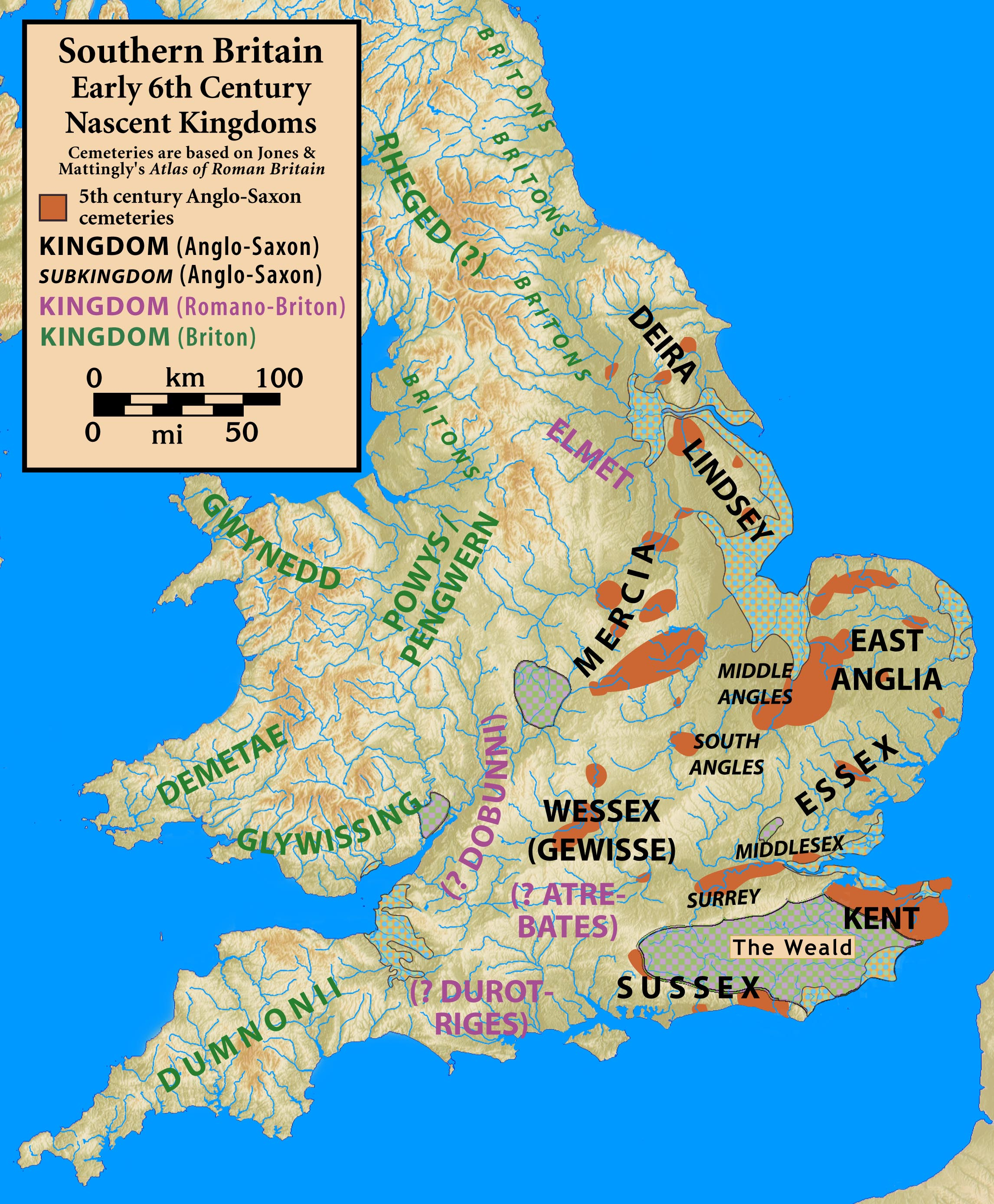
South Britain in the early 6th century

According to the Anglo-Saxon Chronicle, in 495 Cerdic, accompanied by his son Cynric, landed in Britain with five ships at a place called Cerdic's-ore, presumably in what is present-day Hampshire. He is said to have fought a Brittonic king named Natanleod in 508, slaying him along with 5,000 men after which all the land was named 'Natanleaga' up to Cerdices Ford. He then fought another battle against the Britons at Cerdices Ford in 519 based on the Anglo Saxon Chronicle's account. Natanleaga is often identified as Netley Marsh in Hampshire, however, it could refer to the region of the New Forest and Cerdices Ford is associated with North Charford which was called 'Cerde Ford' in the Domesday Book. The conquest of the Isle of Wight is mentioned among his campaigns, and it later was given to his kinsmen Stuf and Wihtgar (who supposedly arrived with the West Saxons in 514). Cerdic is said by the Anglo-Saxon Chronicle to have died in 534, succeeded by his son Cynric.

The early history of Wessex in the Chronicle has been considered unreliable, with duplicate reports of events and seemingly contradictory information. By careful analysis of the Chronicle and the West Saxon Genealogical Regnal List, which drew on a list of kings now lost, David Dumville showed that the earliest texts mentioning Cerdic must have put his reign as 538–554. (Through adaptation of this chronology, the beginning of Cerdic's reign was moved first from 538 to 519 and then again to 500. The resulting chronological gap between the beginning of Cerdic's dynasty and the reliably datable, seventh-century kings was bridged by expanding the reign of Cerdic's distant successor Ceawlin from seven years (581–588) to thirty-two (560–591)).

Because Geoffrey of Monmouth mentions a Cheldric as a Saxon war leader who fought at Bath in the same period, some scholars once suggested that (due to similarities of names) Cerdic was the Saxon leader defeated by the Britons at the Battle of Mount Badon, probably fought in 490 (and possibly later, but not later than 518). This cannot be the case if Dumville is correct, and others assign this battle to Ælle or another Saxon leader, so it appears likely that the origins of the kingdom of Wessex are more complex than the version provided by the surviving traditions.

Some scholars have gone so far as to suggest that Cerdic is purely a legendary figure, but this is a minority view. The Anglo-Saxon Chronicle, the earliest source for Cerdic, was put together in the late ninth century; though it probably does record the extant tradition of the founding of Wessex, the intervening 400 years mean that the account cannot be assumed to be accurate. The annals of the Anglo-Saxon Chronicle, along with the genealogical descents embedded in that source's accounts of later kings, describe Cerdic's succession by his son Cynric. However, the Genealogical Regnal List that served as preface to the Chronicle manuscripts instead interposes a generation between them, indicating that Cerdic was father of Creoda and grandfather of Cynric.

Descent from Cerdic became a necessary qualification for later kings of Wessex, and he was claimed ancestor of Ecgberht, King of Wessex, progenitor of the English royal house and subsequent rulers of England and Britain.

== See also ==
- House of Wessex family tree

Regnal titles
New title Saxons arrive in southern Britain	King of Wessex; 519–534	Succeeded by Cynric
