= Medway Archives Centre =

- Interactive map of Medway Archives Centre
- 51.39774952413927°N 0.4918101845181612°E
- Alternative names: Medway Archives and Local Studies Centre (MALSC)
- Location: 32 Bryant Road, Strood, UK
- Type: Local authority archive
- Established: 1993
- Affiliation: Medway Council
- Period covered: 12th century–present

Building information
- Building: Medway Archives Centre
- Architect: Clay Architecture
- Website: https://cityark.medway.gov.uk/

Medway Archives Centre (formerly the Medway Archives and Local Studies Centre, MALSC) is the local archives service of Medway Council in Kent, England. It preserves and provides access to historical records for the Medway area. Its holdings include official records, local history books, periodicals, newspapers, maps, photographs and other materials relating to the history and people of Medway.

The centre aims “to help everyone discover the stories of Medway’s people and places”, serving the towns of Strood, Rochester, Chatham, Gillingham and Rainham as well as surrounding villages and the Hoo Peninsula. Medway Archives Centre has a public search room (for local studies collections) and a secure archives reading room (for original documents), as well as digital catalogues and research guides. In 2021 the service was awarded Archive Service Accreditation (the UK standard for archival services).

== History ==
- 1993: The service began as the Rochester upon Medway Studies Centre. In March 1993 local studies collections were moved from the Rochester and Chatham public libraries into the Clock Tower building of the Strood Civic Centre.
- 1998: When Medway Council was created as a unitary authority, the centre was renamed the Medway Archives and Local Studies Centre (MALSC). It remained based in the Strood Civic Centre (Clock Tower) building through the 2000s.
- 2015: Following public consultation, Medway Council approved a project to relocate the archives. A report in February 2015 added the relocation of MALSC to the former Strood Library site into the council’s capital programme. The project budget was about £971,000 and design work (by Clay Architecture) began that year.
- 2016–2017: The former Strood Library building on Bryant Road (Strood) was rebuilt and fitted out as a new archives centre. Construction works took place from mid-2016, and the old library hall and meeting spaces were adapted for archives use. The new facility includes two public research rooms, a refurbished foyer with exhibition space, and an environmentally controlled archive strong-room.
- July 2017: The new Medway Archives Centre at 32 Bryant Road, Strood ME2 3EP (the site of the former Strood Library) officially opened on 3 July 2017. It was launched by Cllr Howard Doe, the Council’s Portfolio Holder, who formally opened the centre for public use. After the move, local studies records were immediately available in the new search room, and the archives collection was installed in purpose-built strong-room storage.
- Post-2017: With the archives relocated, the Strood Civic Centre site (which housed the old archives) has been earmarked for redevelopment as part of the Strood Waterfront regeneration scheme. The Strood Waterfront project focuses on council-owned land including the former Civic Centre and aims to build new homes and public spaces on the riverside.

== Collections and services ==
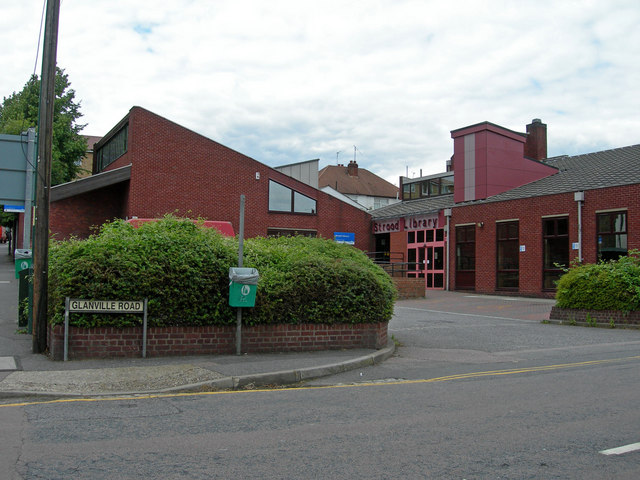
The site of Strood Library, which is now the Archives Centre (2008)

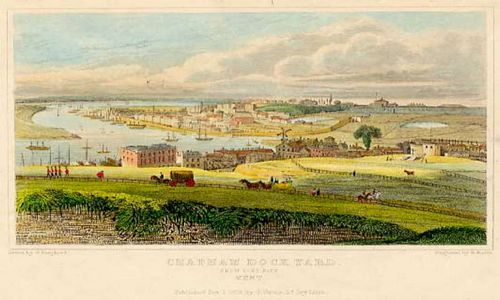
River Medway, Chatham and the Dockyard from Fort Pitt, held at the Archives Centre

Medway Archives Centre holds a wide range of material related to Medway’s history. Its collections include archival records (such as council minutes, planning plans, business and school records), as well as local studies materials (including old maps, newspapers, photographs, books, and pamphlets). There are also electoral registers, nonconformist church records, family history resources, and community archives among the holdings. The centre’s catalogue and finding aids can be searched online (in 2018 the service migrated from the old Cityark system to the new Adlib cataloguing system). Staff offer research guidance on topics like family history or house history, and events such as lectures and exhibitions are held at the centre.

== Accreditation and outreach ==
In recognition of its standards, Medway Archives Centre was awarded Archive Service Accreditation by The National Archives in November 2021. This certification indicates that the centre meets UK national standards in archive management, preservation, and service delivery. The Archives Centre works closely with local heritage groups; for example, the Friends of Medway Archives Centre (a volunteer organisation) supports events, publications and outreach related to the archives (including exhibitions such as “Medway Remembers” on WWII stories). The service also collaborates with other Medway cultural sites (e.g. historic houses and museums) to promote Medway’s history.
