= Cedric (disambiguation) =

Cedric is a male given name.

Cedric may also refer to:

- Cédric (comics), a Belgian comic strip
- Cedric (racehorse) (1821–1829), winner of the 1824 Derby
- Cedric (show jumping horse), gold medal winner at the 2008 Olympics
- Cedric, Alabama
- Nissan Cedric, a sedan car
- RMS Cedric
- Cédric Soares, a Portuguese football player
- "Cedric", a Moomin short story by Tove Jansson
