= House of Wessex =

English royal dynasty

House of Wessex: House of the Gewisse; Cerdicings; West Saxon dynasty; House of the West Saxons
- Country: Kingdom of Wessex; Kingdom of England
- Founded: c. 519
- Founder: Cerdic of the Gewisse
- Final ruler: Edward the Confessor
- Titles: King of the Gewisse; King of the West Saxons; King of the Anglo-Saxons; King of the English; King of England
- Deposition: 1066

The House of Wessex, also known as the House of Cerdic, the House of the West Saxons, the House of the Gewisse, the Cerdicingas and the West Saxon dynasty, was the family, traditionally founded by Cerdic of the Gewisse, that ruled Wessex in Southern England from the early 6th century. The house became dominant in southern England after the accession of King Ecgberht in 802. Alfred the Great saved England from Viking conquest in the late ninth century and his grandson Æthelstan became the first king of England in 927. The disastrous reign of Æthelred the Unready ended in Danish conquest in 1014. Æthelred and his son Edmund Ironside attempted to resist the Vikings in 1016, but after their deaths the Danish Cnut the Great and his sons ruled until 1042. The House of Wessex then briefly regained power under Æthelred's son Edward the Confessor, but lost it after the Confessor's reign, with the Norman Conquest in 1066. All monarchs of England (and subsequently Great Britain) since William II have been descended from the House of Wessex through William the Conqueror's wife Matilda of Flanders, who was a descendant of Alfred the Great through his daughter Ælfthryth. All English and later British monarchs since Henry II are descended from the English kings of the House of Wessex through Henry I's wife, Matilda of Scotland, daughter of Margaret of Wessex, a great-granddaughter of Edmund Ironside.

== History ==
The House of Wessex began to dominate English politics after many years of Mercian hegemony with the reign of Egbert. Egbert's grandson Alfred the Great ruled as King of the Anglo-Saxons from 886 onward. Alfred's son Edward the Elder united southern England under his rule by conquering the Viking occupied areas of Mercia and East Anglia. His son, Æthelstan, extended the kingdom into the northern lands of Northumbria, which lies above the Mersey and Humber, but this was not fully consolidated until after his nephew Edgar succeeded to the throne.

Their rule was often contested, notably by the Danish king Sweyn Forkbeard who invaded in 995 and occupied the united English throne from 1013 to 1014, during the reign of Æthelred the Unready and his son Edmund Ironside. Sweyn, his son Canute and his successors ruled until 1042. After Harthacanute, there was a brief Anglo-Saxon restoration between 1042 and 1066 under Edward the Confessor, who was a son of Æthelred, who was later succeeded by Harold Godwinson, a member of the House of Godwin, possibly a side branch of the Cerdicings (see Ancestry of the Godwins). After the Battle of Hastings, the victorious Duke of Normandy became William I of England. Anglo-Saxon attempts to restore native rule in the person of Edgar the Ætheling, a grandson of Edmund Ironside who had originally been passed over in favour of Harold, were unsuccessful and William's descendants secured their rule. Chroniclers describe conflicting stories about Edgar's later years, including a supposed involvement in the First Crusade; he is presumed to have died around 1126. A Northumberland pipe roll mentions an "Edgar Adeling" in 1158, and 1167, by which time Edgar would have been over 100 years old. Beyond this, there is no existing evidence that the male line of the Cerdicings continued beyond Edgar Ætheling. Edgar's niece Matilda of Scotland later married William's son Henry I to consolidate his claim to the throne, since his father, William the Conqueror already had a tenuous claim to the English throne, and he had an even more tenuous one, forming a link between the two dynasties. Henry II was a descendant of the House of Wessex in the female line, something that contemporary English commentators noted with approval.

== Genealogy ==
For a family tree of the House of Wessex from Cerdic down to the children of King Alfred the Great, see:

- House of Wessex family tree

A continuation into the 10th and 11th centuries can be found at

- English monarchs family tree

== See also ==
- List of monarchs of Wessex
- Wessex
- List of English monarchs

== Sources ==
- Stephen Friar and John Ferguson (1993), Basic Heraldry, W. W. Norton & Company, ISBN 978-0-393-03463-9
- Naismith, Rory (2011). "The Origins of the Line of Egbert, King of the West Saxons, 802–839". English Historical Review. 76 (518): 1–16. doi:10.1093/ehr/ceq377.

Royal house House of Wessex
New title England united under Wessex	Ruling house of England; 829–1013	Succeeded by House of Denmark
Preceded by House of Denmark	Ruling house of England; 1014–16	Succeeded by House of Denmark
Preceded by House of Denmark	Ruling house of England; 1042–66	Succeeded by House of Godwin
