= Gewisse =

Tribe of Anglo-Saxon Britain

The Gewisse (Old English: [jeˈwisːe] ye-WEES-se; Latin: Geuissæ) were a tribe or ruling clan of the Anglo-Saxons. Their first location, mentioned in early medieval sources, was the upper Thames region, around Dorchester on Thames. However, some scholars suggest that the Gewisse had origins among the ancient Britons at Cair-Caratauc (Old Sarum) in Wiltshire. According to Saxon folklore, the Gewisse were the founders of the kingdom of Wessex.

== Etymology ==
The name was first documented as Gewissorum in the eighth century as an ethnonym of the West Saxons. Its origin is uncertain. The Old English adjective ġewisse means "reliable" or "sure", and its corresponding noun means "certainty". Eilert Ekwall proposed that the similarity in toponymy between the kingdoms of the Gewisse and Hwicce suggests a common origin, and an analysis by Richard Coates concluded that Hwicce was of Brittonic origin.

Several linguists believe that the word is not the result of natural linguistic development, but may have been adopted as ethno-political propaganda.

The seventh and eighth centuries indeed saw a pseudo-historical reconstruction of the origins of the English kingdoms. This process of reconstruction culminated in Bede's Ecclesiastical History, but it began before that. It can be seen in the changing nomenclature of the Anglo-Saxons. At its most influential level it can be seen in the growing significance of the term Angli over Saxones, occasioned apparently by Gregory the Great's support of the former term. Arguably more instructive is the evidence supplied by Bede for the renaming of the group known as the Gewisse as West Saxons. It is unfortunate that the etymology of Gewisse is unclear, but it is at least possible that the origins of the word are British, in which case King Ine, successor to Cadwalla, an Anglo-Saxon king with a British name, may deliberately have been rejecting any hint of British tradition among his people. What is clear, whatever the origin of the name Gewisse, is that the followers of Ine were now ostentatiously being identified as Saxon--a point which is of a piece with the evidence for a streamlining of Anglo-Saxon history and, therefore, of Anglo-Saxon identity in the seventh century.

The Anglo-Saxon Chronicle presents an eponymous ancestor figure, named Giwis, which is an example of non-historical founding myths.

The Winchester (or Parker) Chronicle has "Cynric, son of Cerdic, son of Elesa, son of Gewis, son of Wig, son of Freawine, son of Frithugar, son of Brand, son of Beldeg, son of Woden, son of Finn, son of Godwulf, son of Geats" listed as descent from Cerdic of Wessex. This manuscript does not present Gewis as eponymous, but in the Parker Manuscript's current state, is reconstructed from both apparently missing pages of the work, as well as a later fire, long after the manuscript had been recorded and disseminated. According to the Stanford Library, the Provenance of the manuscript is as follows:

Volume I: It was in the Library of Christ Church, Canterbury, no. 311 in Prior Eastry's Catalogue (Ancient Libraries, pp. xxvi, 509). The first leaf with press-mark etc. has disappeared since Parker's time. The first remaining page is numbered 3 by Parker. It appears to have been written at Winchester down to the year 1001, and thereafter at Christ Church, Canterbury. Professor Earle suggested that it was transferred from Winchester to Canterbury when the monks at the latter place were endeavouring to repair the losses in their library caused by the fire of 1067 (Plummer, p. xxv note). Another possibility (New Pal. Soc.) is that Ælfheah, bishop of Winchester, may have brought it with him when he became archbishop in 1006. At the Dissolution the volume came into the hands of Dr Nicholas Wotton the first Dean of Canterbury, who gave it to Parker.

== History ==
Evidence of Germanic settlements appearing around Abingdon and Dorchester on Thames in the 6th and 7th centuries has been used to make assumptions about the origins of the Ġewisse, presuming them to be Germanic mercenaries who may have settled in the region after the end of the Roman occupation to protect a border region between Britons. Another theory holds that the name of the tribe and its founding house is Brittonic and that they originated from the area that would become Old Sarum.

The early Saxon myths say that the Gewisse captured Searobyrig (Old Sarum) in 552 AD and Beranbyrig (Barbury Castle) from the Britons in 556. Birinus converted the Gewisse to Christianity in 636 by baptising their king Cynegils and establishing the Diocese of Dorchester. The Gewisse killed the three sons of Sæbert of Essex around 620, defeated the Britons at the Battle of Peonnum in 660, and by 676 had sufficient control over what is now Hampshire to establish a see at Winchester.

The conquests by the royal house of Gewisse in the 7th and 8th centuries led to the establishment of the Kingdom of Wessex, and Bede treated the two names as interchangeable. It was only during the reign of Cædwalla (685/86 – 688) that the title "king of the Saxons" began to replace "king of the Gewisse". Barbara Yorke has suggested that it was Cædwalla's conquest of the Jutish province and the South Saxons that led to the need for a new title to distinguish the expanded realm from its predecessor. However, as there are no surviving documents to indicate how these people described themselves, the most that can be said is that by the time Bede was writing (early 8th century), the phrase "West Saxons" had come into use by scholars.

== Bibliography ==
- Kirby, D.P. (2000), The earliest English kings, London: Routledge, ISBN 0-415-24210-X
- Leeds, E.T. (1954), "The Growth of Wessex", Oxoniensia, LIX, Oxford Architectural and Historical Society: 55–56
- Yorke, Barbara (1990), Kings and Kingdoms of Early Anglo-Saxon England, London: Routledge, ISBN 0-415-16639-X
- Yorke, Barbara (1995), Wessex in the Early Middle Ages, Continuum International Publishing Group, ISBN 0-7185-1856-X
