= David Dumville =

British medievalist and Celtic scholar (1949–2024)

- Born: 5 May 1949
- Died: 8 September 2024 (aged 75)

Academic background
- Education: Emmanuel College, Cambridge; University of Edinburgh
- Thesis: The textual history of the Welsh-Latin Historia Brittonum (1976)

David Norman Dumville (5 May 1949 – 8 September 2024) was a British medievalist and Celtic scholar.

== Life and career ==
Dumville was born on 5 May 1949 to Norman Dumville and Eileen Florence Lillie Dumville (née Gibbs). He attended St Nicholas Grammar School in Northwood Hills and Emmanuel College, Cambridge, where he studied Anglo-Saxon, Norse and Celtic. He then completed further study at Ludwig-Maximilians-Universität München and received his PhD at the University of Edinburgh in 1976, presenting the thesis "The textual history of the Welsh-Latin Historia Brittonum".

Following his doctoral studies, Dumville was a Fellow of Swansea University (1975–1977) and, in 1977–1978, both assistant professor of English at the University of Pennsylvania and O'Donnell Lecturer in Celtic Studies at the University of Oxford. He became a lecturer in Anglo-Saxon, Norse and Celtic at the University of Cambridge in 1977 (and a fellow of Girton College in 1978), winning promotion to Reader in Early Mediaeval history and Culture of the British Isles (1991–1995) and then to Professor of Palaeography and Cultural History (1995–2005).

In 2005, Dumville moved to the School of Divinity, History and Philosophy at the University of Aberdeen as Professor in History & Palaeography. Shortly afterwards his post was reconfigured to be shared with the School of Language and Literature: Dumville taught in both departments, taking a key role in establishing an MA in Celtic and Anglo-Saxon Studies, with his title changed to Professor in History, Palaeography and Celtic.

Dumville retired in 2020, becoming Emeritus Professor of Celtic & Anglo-Saxon at Aberdeen.

Among other honorary and visiting academic appointments, he was visiting professor at the University of California, Los Angeles (1995). He was a founding member of the Medieval Chronicle Society.

Dumville died on 8 September 2024, at the age of 75.

== Publications ==
Dumville produced numerous scholarly articles and books. In 2007, he established a scholarly journal for Anglo-Saxon studies, entitled Anglo-Saxon, which ceased after one issue. He was also involved in refounding the journals Mediaeval Scandinavia and The Journal of Celtic Studies.
