= 660s =

Decade

The 660s decade ran from January 1, 660, to December 31, 669.

== Events ==
=== 660 ===
==== By place ====
====== Byzantine Empire ======
- Emperor Constans II is paranoid about the ambitions of his younger brother, Theodosius, and has him murdered. Having attracted the hatred of the citizens of Constantinople, Constans decides to leave the Byzantine capital and moves to Syracuse (Sicily).

====== Europe ======
- The March of the Slavs, centred north of modern Klagenfurt, preserves independence and is first mentioned in historical sources, known as Carantania (Austria).
- Felix, patrician of Toulouse, assumes the titles of Duke of Vasconia and Aquitaine. He is formally a vassal of the Franks, but rules "de facto" independently.

====== Britain ======
- King Cenwalh of Wessex becomes dissatisfied with his local bishop, Agilbert of Dorchester, as he does not speak West-Saxon. Cenwalh splits the episcopal see of Wessex in two. Wine becomes the first bishop of Winchester, by the Saxons called Wintancestir. Agilbert resigns in protest and travels north to Northumbria.
- King Sigeberht II of Essex is murdered by his brothers, Swithelm and Swithfrith, and other kinsmen for being "too ready to pardon his enemies"; that is to say, the Christians. Swithelm becomes king of Essex, with Swithfrith as joint-monarch for a period (approximate date).
- King Conall Crandomna of Dál Riata (modern Scotland) dies, and is succeeded by his nephew Domangart mac Domnaill.

====== Korea ======
- July 9 – Battle of Hwangsanbeol: Sillan forces (50,000 men) led by general Kim Yu-shin defeat the army of Baekje at Nonsan. During the fighting general Gyebaek dies at the hand of the Sillan invaders.
- Baekje in southwestern Korea is conquered by an alliance of the Tang dynasty and Silla, led by general Su Dingfang and King Munmu of Silla. The Japanese envoys detained in Chang'an are paroled.
- Emperor Gao Zong suffers from an illness (possibly slow-poisoning). His wife Wu Zetian starts to rule the Chinese Empire.

====== Japan ======
- Prince Naka no Ōe no Ōji of Japan makes a Japanese clock for the first time at Asuka, by which he causes the people to know the hours.
- After the fall of Sabi to the forces of Silla, the Yamato government sends envoys directly to the Chinese court for the first time
- The Baekje–Tang War begins, involving Yamato forces in support of the kingdoms of Baekje and Goguryeo
- Japanese forces, under command of Abe no Hirafu, massacre the Mishihase people in Hokkaido
- The capital of Japan moves from Asuka, Yamato (Okamoto Palace or Nochi no Asuka-Okamoto-no-miya) to Asakura, Fukuoka

=== 661 ===
==== By place ====
====== Europe ======
- King Chlothar III of Neustria and queen regent Balthild found Corbie Abbey in Picardy (northern France), giving it immunity from taxation, and visits from local bishops in exchange for prayer.
- Perctarit and Godepert become co-rulers of the Lombards, following the death of their father Aripert I. They split the kingdom, and establish their capitals in Milan and Pavia (northern Italy).

====== Britain ======
- Battle of Posbury: King Cenwalh of Wessex invades Dumnonia (south-west England). He is victorious over the native Briton tribes near Crediton in Devon, and drives them to the coast.
- King Wulfhere of Mercia and his army harry the Berkshire Downs (south of Thame) and move south to conquer the Meonwara and the Isle of Wight.
- Wulfhere appoints Æthelwealh as king of Sussex, and Æthelwealh is baptized in Mercia. He receives the recently-conquered territories in modern-day Hampshire.

====== Arabian Empire (Islamic Caliphate) ======
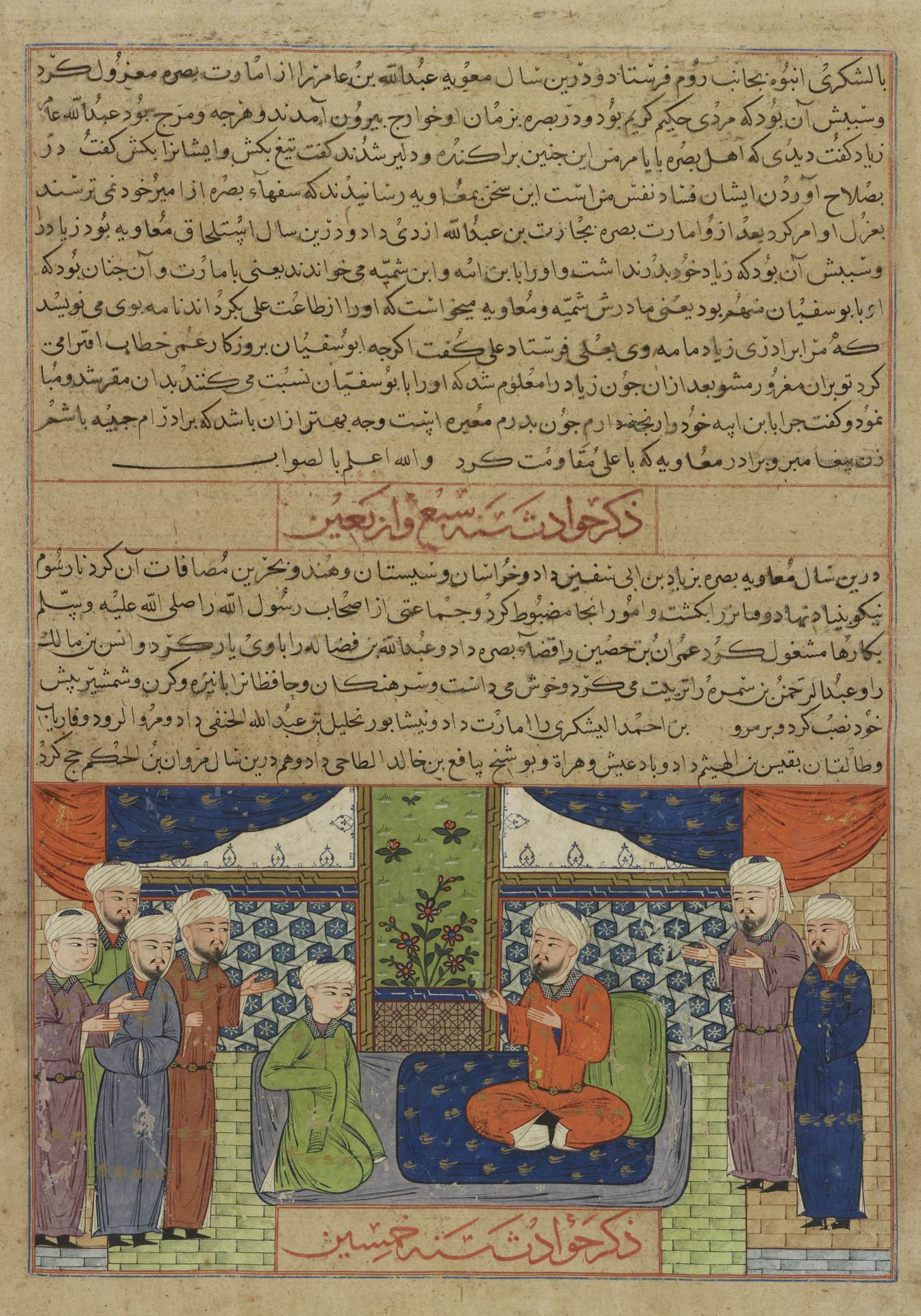
Muawiya I became caliph in mid 661, after the Abdication of caliph al-Hasan. Muawiya established the Umayyad dynasty (Muawiya with Councillors, from the manuscript of Hafiz-i Abru’s Majma’ al-tawarikh)

- January 26 – Assassination of Ali: Ali ibn Abi Talib, first Shia imam and fourth caliph of the Rashidun Caliphate, is struck on the head with a poisoned sword by the Khawarij Abd-al-Rahman ibn Muljam, while at prayer at a shrine at Kufa (modern-day), dying two days later. His son, Hasan ibn Ali, is chosen by Muslims to succeed him as the next leader. According to the Umayyads, he is succeeded by Muawiyah I as Caliph, age 59, who moves his seat of government to Damascus, and founds the Umayyad Caliphate, ending the Rashidun Caliphate.
- Approximate date – Muawiya I imprisons patriarch Giwargis I, after his refusal to pay tribute. Christians are persecuted and their churches are destroyed.

====== Japan ======
- Approximate date – The imperial fleet of Japan invades Kyūshū by the order of Empress Saimei. On its way, princess Nukata composes a famous poem at Nikitatsu in Iyo Province.
- c. May – Empress Saimei builds the palace of Asakura in Kyūshū, from trees cut down from the shrines. Two months later she dies. People say it is because the gods are angry with her for destroying the shrines.
- July 24 – Emperor Tenji ascends to the throne of Japan after his mother Empress Saimei’s death. He sends an expeditionary force under Abe no Hirafu to Korea, to help the allied kingdom of Baekje.

====== Korea ======
- King Munmu becomes the 30th ruler of the Korean kingdom of Silla.

==== By topic ====
====== Religion ======
- Maximus the Confessor, Christian monk, is recalled from exile in Thrace. He is tried, and sentenced to mutilation. His tongue and his right hand are cut off to prevent his further opposition to the Monothelites.
- Approximate date – In Gaul all Roman bishops are replaced with Frankish bishops. They become increasingly common, as Frankish leaders control the episcopate.

=== 662 ===
==== By place ====
====== Europe ======
- King Godepert makes war against his brother Perctarit. He seeks the aid of Grimoald I, duke of Benevento, who has him assassinated; his son Raginpert escapes. Grimoald usurps the throne and becomes ruler of the Lombard Kingdom. Perctarit is exiled, and seeks refuge in Gaul and Britain.
- The Franks take advantage of the Lombard civil war and invade Northern Italy, but are defeated by Grimoald I. King Chlothar III gives Austrasia to his youngest brother Childeric II. He is raised on the shield of his warriors and proclaimed king of Austrasia.

====== Britain ======
- King Swithelm of Essex is converted to Christianity and baptised by Cedd, at the court of King Æthelwald of East Anglia, who acts as his sponsor. East Anglia may have held some sort of overlordship over Essex at this time (approximate date).

====== Arab Empire ======
- Muslim Conquest: Arab forces of the Umayyad Caliphate resume the push to capture Persian lands, and begin to move towards the lands east and north of the plateau, towards Greater Khorasan (Iran) and the Silk Road along Transoxiana.
- Ziyad ibn Abi Sufyan, Muslim general and a member of the Umayyad clan, is appointed governor of Iraq (Basra) and the former Persian provinces (approximate date).

==== By topic ====
====== Religion ======
- August 13 – Maximus the Confessor, Byzantine monk and theologian, dies in exile in Lazica (modern Georgia), on the southeastern shore of the Black Sea.

=== 663 ===
==== By place ====
====== Byzantine Empire ======
- Emperor Constans II launches an assault against the Duchy of Benevento (Southern Italy). Taking advantage of the fact that Lombard king Grimoald I is engaged against Frankish forces from Neustria, Constans disembarks at Taranto, and besieges Lucera and Benevento.
- Constans II visits Rome for 12 days (the only emperor to set foot in Rome for two centuries), and is received with great honor by Pope Vitalian. Constans gives the order to strip buildings, including the Pantheon, of their ornaments, which will be carried back to Constantinople.
- Constans II moves the imperial court from Constantinople to Syracuse. He tries to stop the Arab conquest of Sicily, and restores Rome as seat of the Byzantine Empire. Constans strips sacred altar vessels from churches all over Rome.
- May 8 – Battle of Forino: The Byzantine army, led by Constans II, is defeated by the Lombards under Romuald I. He seizes Taranto and Brindisi, receiving military aid from the Bulgar Alcek horde, who are settled in the area of Ravenna.

====== Britain ======
- King Oswiu of Northumbria invades Pictland (modern Scotland). He establishes overlordship of, at least, the Southern Pictish sub-kingdoms of Fortriu and Fib (and possibly Circinn).
- A brief outbreak of plague hits Britain (approximate date).

====== Asia ======
- June 5 – In China, the Daming Palace becomes the government seat and royal residence of Emperor Gao Zong of the Tang dynasty.
- Battle of Baekgang: Korean Baekje forces and their Japanese allies are defeated in a naval battle, by a joint Silla–Tang coalition.
- Mount Fuji is estimated to have been first climbed by a monk in this year.

==== By topic ====
====== Religion ======
- Wine, bishop of Winchester, moves the episcopal see north again to Dorchester.

=== 664 ===
==== By place ====
====== North America & Europe ======
- 1 May – A solar eclipse affects areas along a line from Central America, through eastern North America, the North Atlantic, Ireland, Great Britain and Germany.

====== Great Britain & Ireland ======
- Plague of 664
  - According to Bede, a Northumbrian monk and historian, the plague begins shortly after the eclipse of 1 May.
  - Adomnan of Iona, a contemporary Irish abbot and saint, writes that the epidemic affects all of Ireland and Great Britain, except for Dál Riata and Pictland.
  - The epidemic significantly depopulates southern coastal areas of England.
- The Kingdom of Gwynedd is also devastated by the plague; King Cadafael Cadomedd dies and is succeeded by Cadwaladr, who reasserts himself in his kingdom by sending his son Ivor from Brittany to be regent.
- King Ealdwulf succeeds Æthelwald as king of East Anglia. He becomes the last ruler recorded known to Bede. During Ealdwulf's reign the plague sweeps across the Anglo-Saxon kingdoms.
- July 14 – The plague claims King Eorcenberht of Kent, who dies after a 24-year reign, and is succeeded by his son Ecgberht. Queen Seaxburh becomes regent, ruling Kent until Ecgberht comes of age.
- King Swithelm of Essex dies after a four-year reign. He is succeeded by his cousins Sighere and Sæbbi (approximate date).
- 26 October – The plague claims Cedd, Bishop of London.

====== Arabian Empire ======
- Muslim Conquest: Arab forces under Al-Muhallab ibn Abi Sufra begin launching raids from Persia, striking at Multan in the southern Punjab (modern Pakistan). Muslims conquer the city of Kabul, invading from eastern Afghanistan.

==== By topic ====
====== Religion ======
- Synod of Whitby: King Oswiu of Northumbria calls for a meeting at Whitby Abbey to settle the church practices in his kingdom—those of the Celtic Church (of Wales, Scotland and the north of England – preached by Irish missionaries) or the Roman Church (of the south of England). The matters discussed include how to calculate the date of Easter. It is decided to follow the practice of Rome. As a result, many Irish clergy leave Northumbria and return to Ireland.

=== 665 ===
==== By place ====
====== Europe ======
- Kubrat, ruler (khagan) of Great Bulgaria, dies after a 33-year reign. He is succeeded by his son Batbayan, who rules from Poltava (modern Ukraine), the lands north of the Black Sea, and the Sea of Azov.

====== Britain ======
- Conflict erupts between King Sighere of Essex and his brother Sæbbi, as they struggle for overlordship between Mercia and Wessex.

====== Arabian Empire ======
- Muslim Conquest: An Arab army (40,000 men) advances through the desert, and captures the Byzantine city of Barca (Libya).

====== Asia ======
- The city of Seongnam (South Korea) is renamed Hansanju (approximate date).
- Wu Zetian, the wife of the Chinese emperor, unofficially becomes an absolute ruler by eliminating her political rivals.

==== By topic ====
====== Religion ======
- Wilfrid, Anglo-Saxon abbot, refuses to be consecrated in Northumbria as bishop, and travels to Compiègne (France) to be consecrated by Agilbert, archbishop of Paris.
- Jaruman, bishop of Mercia, is dispatched with Christian missionaries to reconvert Saxon tribes, which have returned to paganism.
- According to the Annales Cambriae, the Anglo-Saxons convert to Christianity after the Second Battle of Badon.
- Sighere encourages his subjects to reject Christianity and return to their indigenous religion (approximate date).

====== Science ======
- Brahmagupta writes his Khandakhadyaka.

=== 666 ===
==== By place ====
====== Byzantine Empire ======
- Emperor Constans II grants the request of Bishop Maurus of Ravenna, allowing the city to consecrate its bishop without approval from Rome (approximate date).

====== Europe ======
- Duke Lupus of Friuli revolts against King Grimoald I, with allied Avars. Grimoald takes and devastates Friuli, tracks down Lupus's son Arnefrit (allied with the Slaves), and beats him and kills him in battle at the castle of Nimis. Grimoald appoints Wechtar as the new duke of Friuli.

====== Asia ======
- Chinese Buddhist monks Zhi Yu and Zhi Yuo craft more south-pointing chariot vehicles (a non-magnetic, mechanical-driven directional-compass vehicle that incorporates the use of a differential).

====== Religion ======
- Wilfrid returns to Great Britain, but is shipwrecked in Sussex. When he finally reaches Northumbria, he finds he has been deposed and is forced to retire to Ripon.
- Earconwald, Anglo-Saxon abbot, establishes the Benedictine abbeys, Chertsey Abbey (Surrey) for men and Barking Abbey (now in east London) for women.

=== 667 ===
==== By place ====
====== Byzantine Empire ======
- Arab–Byzantine War: Caliph Muawiyah I launches a series of attacks against Byzantine holdings in Africa, Sicily and the East.

====== Europe ======
- The Lombards, under King Grimoald I, destroy Oderzo (Northern Italy). Much of its population flees to the nearby city of Heraclea.

====== Arabian Empire ======
- King Javanshir of Caucasian Albania (modern Azerbaijan) revolts against the Muslim-Arabs, but is defeated (approximate date).

==== By topic ====
====== Religion ======
- Wighard, archbishop of Canterbury, dies of the bubonic plague while returning from his consecration in Rome.
- The Abbey of St. Vaast in Arras (France) is founded.

=== 668 ===
==== By place ====
====== Byzantine Empire ======
- July 15 – Emperor Constans II is killed under mysterious circumstances in his bath, during a mutiny at Syracuse. The Byzantine court returns to Constantinople after an absence of 5 years, in which the Muslim-Arabs have made annual invasions and devastations of Anatolia. Probably assassinated by his chamberlain after a 27-year reign, Constans is succeeded by his son Constantine IV (the "Bearded"), alongside his brothers Heraclius and Tiberius as co-emperors.
- Mezezius, Byzantine general and patrikios ("first patrician"), is proclaimed emperor by the army in Syracuse. Constantine IV organizes an expedition to suppress the military revolt in Sicily.

====== Europe ======
- Ebroin, mayor of the palace, becomes de facto ruler of Neustria and (in theory) "of the Franks". According to Bede, he runs the nation's foreign policy and internal security.
- Kotrag, ruler (khagan) of Great Bulgaria, leads the Khazars in overthrowing his brother Batbayan of the Onogurs, and moves south into the Carpathian Mountains.
- Asparukh, leader of the Utigurs, leaves the Ongal area to Kotrag, and leads his people into Moesia in Northern Bulgaria (approximate date).

====== Arabian Empire ======
- Caliph Muawiyah I receives an invitation from Saborios, Byzantine commander of the troops in Armenia, to help overthrow Constantine IV in Constantinople. He sends a Muslim army under his son Yazid, against the Byzantine Empire.
- Yazid reaches Chalcedon in Bithynia, and takes the important Byzantine center Amorium (modern Turkey).
- Arab forces conquer the Garamantes in the Sahara desert (Libya).

====== Asia ======
- Chinese troops sent by the Tang dynasty emperor Gao Zong complete their expedition in the Korean Peninsula. Leaders of the expedition have been selected by the emperor's powerful concubine Wu Zetian. The kingdom of Goguryeo is overthrown; the Unified Silla period starts.
- Emperor Tenji of Japan officially accedes to the throne, and hunts on the Moor of Ōmi-Gamōno. The letters exchanged between prince Ōama and princess Nukata are recorded in Man'yōshū.
- The monk Gyōki, one of the founders of Japanese Buddhism, is born in the Ōtori District of Kawachi Province.

==== By topic ====
====== Religion ======
- Theodore of Tarsus is made archbishop of Canterbury. He introduces a strict Roman parochial system that becomes the model for the secular state.
- Colman of Lindisfarne, accompanied by 30 disciples, sails for Ireland, settling down at Inishbofin and founds a monastery.

=== 669 ===
==== By place ====
====== Byzantine Empire ======
- Spring – Arab forces that have taken Chalcedon, on the Asian shore of the Bosporus, threaten the Byzantine capital Constantinople. The Muslim-Arabs are decimated by famine and disease. Yazid, the Arab commander, retreats to the island of Cyzicus (modern Turkey).

====== Britain ======
- King Ecgberht of Kent loses the overlordship of Surrey to King Wulfhere of Mercia. Ecgberht then grants the old Saxon Shore Fort at Reculver (south-east England) to a priest named Bassa, in order to establish a monastery dedicated to St. Mary (approximate date).

====== Asia ======
- November 14 – Kamatari, Japanese statesman and reformer, receives the surname Fujiwara from Emperor Tenji as a reward for his services, but dies in Yamato prefecture (modern-day Sakurai City). ^{[Significance of this event is unclear]}

== Births ==
660

- Acca, bishop of Hexham (approximate date)
- Genmei, empress of Japan (d. 721)
- John of Dailam, Syrian monk (d. 738)
- Leudwinus, Frankish bishop (approximate date)
- Rupert, bishop of Salzburg (approximate date)
- Yamanoue no Okura, Japanese poet (d. 733)

661

- February 12 – Ōku, Japanese princess (d. 702)
- Early June – Al-Hajjaj ibn Yusuf, Arab governor (d. 714)
- Approximate date – Ælfwine, Northumbrian king of Deira (k. 679)
- Chen Zi'ang, Chinese poet and official (d. 702)
- Liu Zhiji, Chinese historian (d. 721)

662

- June 22 – Rui Zong, emperor of the Tang dynasty (d. 716)
- Ali al-Akbar ibn Husayn, Muslim martyr (d. 680)
- Kakinomoto no Hitomaro, Japanese poet (approximate date)
- Kusakabe, Japanese crown prince (d. 689)
- Odile of Alsace, Frankish abbess (approximate date)
- Rumwold of Buckingham, Anglo-Saxon prince and saint

663

- Nasr ibn Sayyar, Arab general (d. 748)
- Ōtsu, Japanese prince and poet (d. 686)
- Song Jing, chancellor of the Tang dynasty (d. 737)
- Yamanobe, Japanese princess (approximate date)
- Zhang Yue, chancellor of the Tang dynasty (d. 730)

664

- Constantine I, Syrian-born pope of the Catholic Church (d. 715)
- Muawiya II, Muslim caliph (d. 684)
- Shangguan Wan'er, Chinese poet (d. 710)

665

- Ōtomo no Tabito, Japanese poet (d. 729)
- Sa'id ibn Jubayr, Muslim scholar (d. 714)

666

- Zhang Jiazhen, Chinese official

667

- Hisham ibn Urwah, prominent narrator of hadith and scholar
- Qasim ibn Hasan, son of Hassan ibn Ali

668

- Al-Walid I, Muslim caliph (d. 715)
- Gyōki, Japanese Buddhist priest (d. 749)
- Justinian II, Eastern Roman Emperor (d. 711)

669

- Gregory II, pope of the Catholic Church (d. 731)
- Justinian II, Byzantine emperor (approximate date)
- Qutayba ibn Muslim, Arab general (approximate date)

== Deaths ==
660

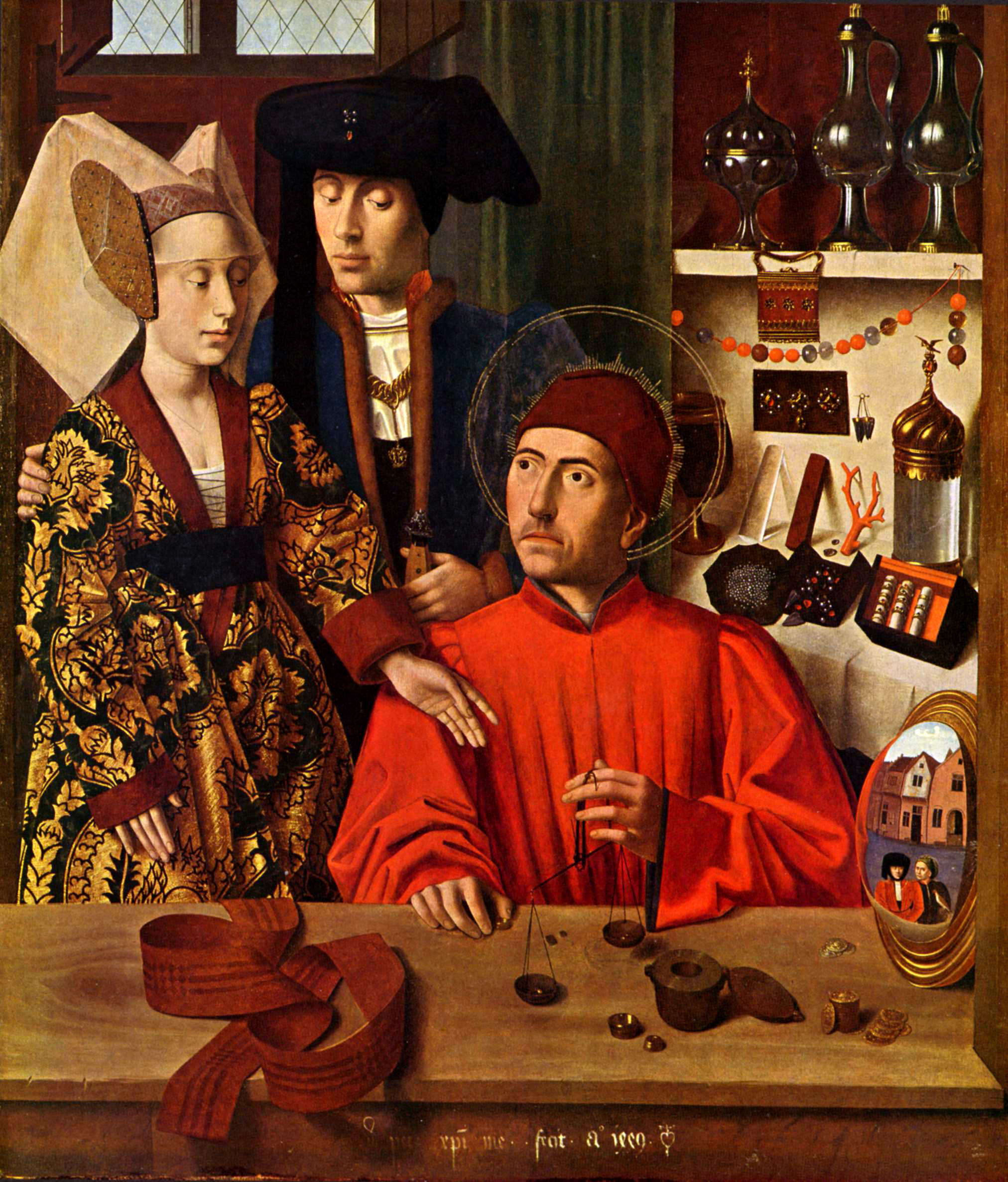
Saint Eligius

- December 1 – Eligius, bishop and saint
- Boggis, Duke of Aquitaine (approximate date)
- Conall Crandomna, king of Dál Riata (Scotland)
- Gyebaek, general of Baekje (Korea)
- Magnus, bishop and governor of Avignon
- Sigebert III, king of Austrasia (or 656)
- Sigeberht II, king of Essex (approximate date)
- Xin Maojiang, chancellor of the Tang dynasty

661

- January 3 – Benjamin, Coptic Orthodox Patriarch of Alexandria (b. c.590)
- January 29 – Ali, first Shia Imam and Fourth Rashidun Caliph (b. 601) (martyred)
- February 17 – Finan of Lindisfarne, Irish-born bishop
- July 24 – Kōgyoku (also Saimei), twice empress of Japan (b. 594)
- Aripert I, king of the Lombards
- Cenberht, West Saxon king in Wessex
- Cuthred, West Saxon prince in Wessex
- Approximate date – Landry, bishop of Paris
- Al-Ash'ath ibn Qays, companion of the Muhammad

662

- August 13 – Maximus the Confessor, Byzantine theologian
- Godepert, king of the Lombards
- Rumwold of Buckingham, Anglo-Saxon prince and saint
- Lai Ji, official of the Tang dynasty (b. 610)
- Qais Abdur Rashid from whom all Pashtuns descend according to local Pashto folklore

663

- Ago, duke of Friuli (approximate date)
- Cunibert, bishop of Cologne (approximate date)
- Gartnait IV, king of the Picts (approximate date)
- Guaire Aidne mac Colmáin, king of Connacht (Ireland)
- Gwisil Boksin, Korean general of Baekje (Korea)

664

- January 6 – 'Amr ibn al-'As, Arab general
- July 14 – Eorcenberht, king of Kent
- October 26 – Cedd, bishop of London
- Æthelwald, king of East Anglia (approximate date)
- Alhfrith, king of Deira (approximate date)
- Cadafael Cadomedd, king of Gwynedd (Wales)
- Deusdedit of Canterbury, archbishop of Canterbury
- Swithelm, king of Essex (approximate date)
- Tuda, bishop of Lindisfarne
- Xuanzang, Chinese Buddhist monk and traveler

665

- April 16 – Fructuosus of Braga, French archbishop
- Féchín of Fore, Irish monk and saint
- Hafsa bint Umar, wife of Muhammad
- Kubrat, ruler (khagan) of Great Bulgaria
- Li Zhong, prince of the Tang dynasty (b. 643)
- Yu Zhining, chancellor of the Tang dynasty (b. 588)

666

- Abd al-Rahman ibn Abi Bakr, first child of first Rashidun caliph, Abu Bakr
- Arnefrit, duke of Friuli (Northern Italy)
- Liu Xiangdao, official of the Tang dynasty (b. 596)
- Li Yifu, chancellor of the Tang dynasty
- Dou Dexuan, official of the Tang dynasty
- Liu Xiangdao, Chancellor of the Tang dynasty
- Linghu Defen, official of the Tang dynasty
- Yŏn Kaesomun, military dictator of Goguryeo
- Umm Habiba, a wife of Muhammad

667

- January 23 – Ildefonsus, bishop of Toledo
- Daoxuan, Chinese Buddhist monk (b. 596)
- Severus Sebokht, Syrian scholar and bishop
- Su Dingfang, general of the Tang dynasty (b. 591)
- Wighard, archbishop of Canterbury (approximate date)

668

- September 15 – Constans II, Byzantine emperor (b. 630)
- Brahmagupta, Indian mathematician and astronomer (b. ca. 598)
- Judoc, Breton noble and Catholic saint (b. 600)
- Saborios, Byzantine general (approximate date)
- Wandregisel, Frankish monk and abbot
- Zhiyan, Chinese (Buddhist) patriarch (b. 602)

669

- November 14 – Fujiwara no Kamatari, founder of the Fujiwara clan (b. 614)
- December 31 – Li Shiji, general and chancellor of the Tang dynasty (b. 594)
- Jaruman, bishop of Mercia (approximate date)
- Mezezius, Byzantine usurper (approximate date)
