= 664 =

Calendar year

664 in various calendars
- Gregorian calendar: 664; DCLXIV
- Ab urbe condita: 1417
- Armenian calendar: 113; ԹՎ ՃԺԳ
- Assyrian calendar: 5414
- Balinese saka calendar: 585–586
- Bengali calendar: 70–71
- Berber calendar: 1614
- Buddhist calendar: 1208
- Burmese calendar: 26
- Byzantine calendar: 6172–6173
- Chinese calendar: 癸亥年 (Water Pig); 3361 or 3154 — to — 甲子年 (Wood Rat); 3362 or 3155
- Coptic calendar: 380–381
- Discordian calendar: 1830
- Ethiopian calendar: 656–657
- Hebrew calendar: 4424–4425
- Hindu calendars
- Vikram Samvat: 720–721
- Shaka Samvat: 585–586
- Kali Yuga: 3764–3765
- Holocene calendar: 10664
- Iranian calendar: 42–43
- Islamic calendar: 43–44
- Japanese calendar: Hakuchi 15 (白雉１５年)
- Javanese calendar: 555–556
- Julian calendar: 664; DCLXIV
- Korean calendar: 2997
- Minguo calendar: 1248 before ROC 民前1248年
- Nanakshahi calendar: −804
- Seleucid era: 975/976 AG
- Thai solar calendar: 1206–1207
- Tibetan calendar: ཆུ་མོ་ཕག་ལོ་ (female Water-Boar); 790 or 409 or −363 — to — ཤིང་ཕོ་བྱི་བ་ལོ་ (male Wood-Rat); 791 or 410 or −362

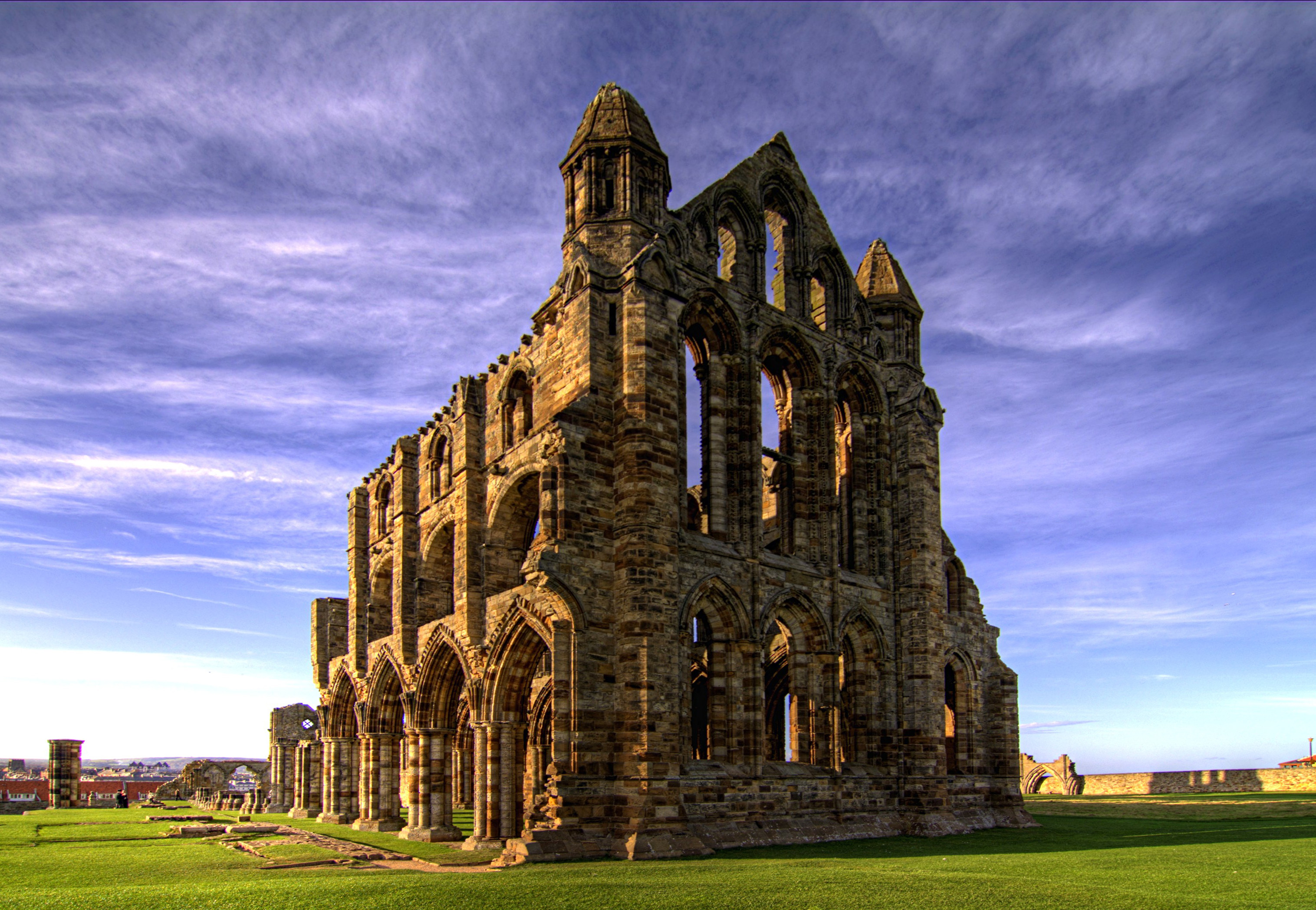
Ruins of Whitby Abbey (North Yorkshire)

Year 664 (DCLXIV) was a leap year starting on Monday of the Julian calendar. The denomination 664 for this year has been used since the early medieval period, when the Anno Domini calendar era became the prevalent method in Europe for naming years.

== Events ==
=== By place ===
==== North America & Europe ====
- 1 May – A solar eclipse affects areas along a line from Central America, through eastern North America, the North Atlantic, Ireland, Great Britain and Germany.

==== Great Britain & Ireland ====
- Plague of 664
  - According to Bede, a Northumbrian monk and historian, the plague begins shortly after the eclipse of 1 May.
  - Adomnan of Iona, a contemporary Irish abbot and saint, writes that the epidemic affects all of Ireland and Great Britain, except for Dál Riata and Pictland.
  - The epidemic significantly depopulates southern coastal areas of England.
- The Kingdom of Gwynedd is also devastated by the plague; King Cadafael Cadomedd dies and is succeeded by Cadwaladr, who reasserts himself in his kingdom by sending his son Ivor from Brittany to be regent.
- King Ealdwulf succeeds Æthelwald as king of East Anglia. He becomes the last ruler recorded known to Bede. During Ealdwulf's reign the plague sweeps across the Anglo-Saxon kingdoms.
- July 14 – The plague claims King Eorcenberht of Kent, who dies after a 24-year reign, and is succeeded by his son Ecgberht. Queen Seaxburh becomes regent, ruling Kent until Ecgberht comes of age.
- King Swithelm of Essex dies after a four-year reign. He is succeeded by his cousins Sighere and Sæbbi (approximate date).
- 26 October – The plague claims Cedd, Bishop of London.

==== Arabian Empire ====
- Muslim Conquest: Arab forces under Al-Muhallab ibn Abi Sufra begin launching raids from Persia, striking at Multan in the southern Punjab (modern Pakistan). Muslims conquer the city of Kabul, invading from eastern Afghanistan.

==== Asia ====
The Eldest deceased daughter of Emperor Gaozong of Tang and Wu Zetian is posthumously honored with the title Princess Anding, along with the posthumous name "Si", ten years after her death, making her Princess Si of Anding.

=== By topic ===
==== Religion ====
- Synod of Whitby: King Oswiu of Northumbria calls for a meeting at Whitby Abbey to settle the church practices in his kingdom—those of the Celtic Church (of Wales, Scotland and the north of England – preached by Irish missionaries) or the Roman Church (of the south of England). The matters discussed include how to calculate the date of Easter. It is decided to follow the practice of Rome. As a result, many Irish clergy leave Northumbria and return to Ireland.

== Births ==
- Constantine I, Syrian-born pope of the Catholic Church (d. 715)
- Muawiya II, Muslim caliph (d. 684)
- Shangguan Wan'er, Chinese poet (d. 710)

== Deaths ==
- January 6 – 'Amr ibn al-'As, Arab general
- July 14 – Eorcenberht, king of Kent
- October 26 – Cedd, bishop of London
- Æthelwald, king of East Anglia (approximate date)
- Alhfrith, king of Deira (approximate date)
- Cadafael Cadomedd, king of Gwynedd (Wales)
- Deusdedit of Canterbury, archbishop of Canterbury
- Swithelm, king of Essex (approximate date)
- Tuda, bishop of Lindisfarne
- Xuanzang, Chinese Buddhist monk and traveler
