= 683 =

Calendar year

683 in various calendars
- Gregorian calendar: 683; DCLXXXIII
- Ab urbe condita: 1436
- Armenian calendar: 132; ԹՎ ՃԼԲ
- Assyrian calendar: 5433
- Balinese saka calendar: 604–605
- Bengali calendar: 89–90
- Berber calendar: 1633
- Buddhist calendar: 1227
- Burmese calendar: 45
- Byzantine calendar: 6191–6192
- Chinese calendar: 壬午年 (Water Horse); 3380 or 3173 — to — 癸未年 (Water Goat); 3381 or 3174
- Coptic calendar: 399–400
- Discordian calendar: 1849
- Ethiopian calendar: 675–676
- Hebrew calendar: 4443–4444
- Hindu calendars
- Vikram Samvat: 739–740
- Shaka Samvat: 604–605
- Kali Yuga: 3783–3784
- Holocene calendar: 10683
- Iranian calendar: 61–62
- Islamic calendar: 63–64
- Japanese calendar: Hakuchi 34 (白雉３４年)
- Javanese calendar: 575–576
- Julian calendar: 683; DCLXXXIII
- Korean calendar: 3016
- Minguo calendar: 1229 before ROC 民前1229年
- Nanakshahi calendar: −785
- Seleucid era: 994/995 AG
- Thai solar calendar: 1225–1226
- Tibetan calendar: ཆུ་ཕོ་རྟ་ལོ་ (male Water-Horse); 809 or 428 or −344 — to — ཆུ་མོ་ལུག་ལོ་ (female Water-Sheep); 810 or 429 or −343

The tombstone of king Pacal the Great

Year 683 (DCLXXXIII) was a common year starting on Thursday of the Julian calendar. The denomination 683 for this year has been used since the early medieval period, when the Anno Domini calendar era became the prevalent method in Europe for naming years.

== Events ==
=== By place ===
==== Britain ====
- King Sighere of Essex dies after a 19-year joint reign. His brother Sæbbi becomes the sole ruler of Essex until his death in 694.

==== Arabian Empire ====
- Second Fitna:
  - August 26 – Battle of al-Harra: The Umayyad Caliphate defeats the rebel defenders of Medina, at a lava field northeast of the city.
  - September–November – Siege of Mecca: The Umayyad army led by Husayn ibn Numayr al-Sakuni besieges Mecca, during which the Kaaba ("Sacred House") catches fire and is burned down.
  - November 14 – Caliph Yazid I dies at Damascus, after a 3-year reign marked by civil war. He is succeeded by his son Muawiya II as ruler of the Umayyad Caliphate.
  - According to Bar Hebraeus, a great comet appeared for eleven days, and there was a severe winter, and the Euphrates froze over, and olive groves and vineyards withered, and beasts, and cattle, and birds came to an end.

==== Asia ====
- December 27 – Emperor Gaozong dies at Luoyang, age 55, after a 34-year reign in which he expanded the Chinese Empire by acquiring Korea as a vassal state.
- Emperor Tenmu decrees a reform in Japan; copper coins must be used instead of silver coins. Three days later he issues a decree to allow the continued use of silver.
- Prince Ōtsu, son of Tenmu, starts to attend to matters of State at about this time.
- Srivijaya is founded by Sri Jayanasa in Sumatra

==== Mesoamerica ====
- K'inich Janaab' Pakal ("Pacal the Great"), ruler (ajaw) of the Maya state of Palenque (Mexico), dies after a 68-year reign. He is buried in the Temple of the Inscriptions. He is the longest-reigning monarch in the world until Louis XIV breaks that record in 1711, almost 1028 years later and remains the longest-reigning monarch in the Americas until Elizabeth II breaks that record in 2020, almost 1337 years later

=== By topic ===
==== Art ====
- Approximate date – The sarcophagus lid in the tomb of K'inich Janaab' Pakal (Shield 2), Temple of the Inscriptions, Palenque, Mexico (Maya culture) is made.

==== Religion ====
- June 28 – Pope Leo II dies at Rome 10 months after being consecrated.
- Approximate date – Seaxwulf, bishop of Mercia, founds All Saints' Church at Brixworth in England.

== Births ==
- Bilge Khan, ruler (khagan) of the Turkic Khaganate (or 684)
- Monmu, emperor of Japan (d. 707)
- Yi Xing, Chinese astronomer and mechanical engineer (d. 727)

== Deaths ==
- June 28 – Leo II, pope of the Catholic Church (b. 611)
- November 11 – Yazid I, Muslim caliph (b. 647)
- December 27 – Gao Zong, emperor of the Tang dynasty (b. 628)
- Æbbe, Anglo-Saxon princess and abbess
- Anseung, king of Goguryeo (Korea)
- Cui Zhiwen, official of the Tang dynasty (b. 627)
- Dúnchad Muirisci, king of Connacht (Ireland)
- K'inich Janaab' Pakal ("Pacal the Great"), ruler (ajaw) of Palenque (b. 603)
- Sighere, king of Essex
- Waningus, Frankish abbot (approximate date)
- Xue Rengui, general of the Tang dynasty (b. 614)
- Xue Yuanchao, official of the Tang dynasty (b. 622)
