= 616 =

Calendar year

616 in various calendars
- Gregorian calendar: 616; DCXVI
- Ab urbe condita: 1369
- Armenian calendar: 65; ԹՎ ԿԵ
- Assyrian calendar: 5366
- Balinese saka calendar: 537–538
- Bengali calendar: 22–23
- Berber calendar: 1566
- Buddhist calendar: 1160
- Burmese calendar: −22
- Byzantine calendar: 6124–6125
- Chinese calendar: 乙亥年 (Wood Pig); 3313 or 3106 — to — 丙子年 (Fire Rat); 3314 or 3107
- Coptic calendar: 332–333
- Discordian calendar: 1782
- Ethiopian calendar: 608–609
- Hebrew calendar: 4376–4377
- Hindu calendars
- Vikram Samvat: 672–673
- Shaka Samvat: 537–538
- Kali Yuga: 3716–3717
- Holocene calendar: 10616
- Iranian calendar: 6 BP – 5 BP
- Islamic calendar: 6 BH – 5 BH
- Japanese calendar: N/A
- Javanese calendar: 506–507
- Julian calendar: 616; DCXVI
- Korean calendar: 2949
- Minguo calendar: 1296 before ROC 民前1296年
- Nanakshahi calendar: −852
- Seleucid era: 927/928 AG
- Thai solar calendar: 1158–1159
- Tibetan calendar: ཤིང་མོ་ཕག་ལོ་ (female Wood-Boar); 742 or 361 or −411 — to — མེ་ཕོ་བྱི་བ་ལོ་ (male Fire-Rat); 743 or 362 or −410

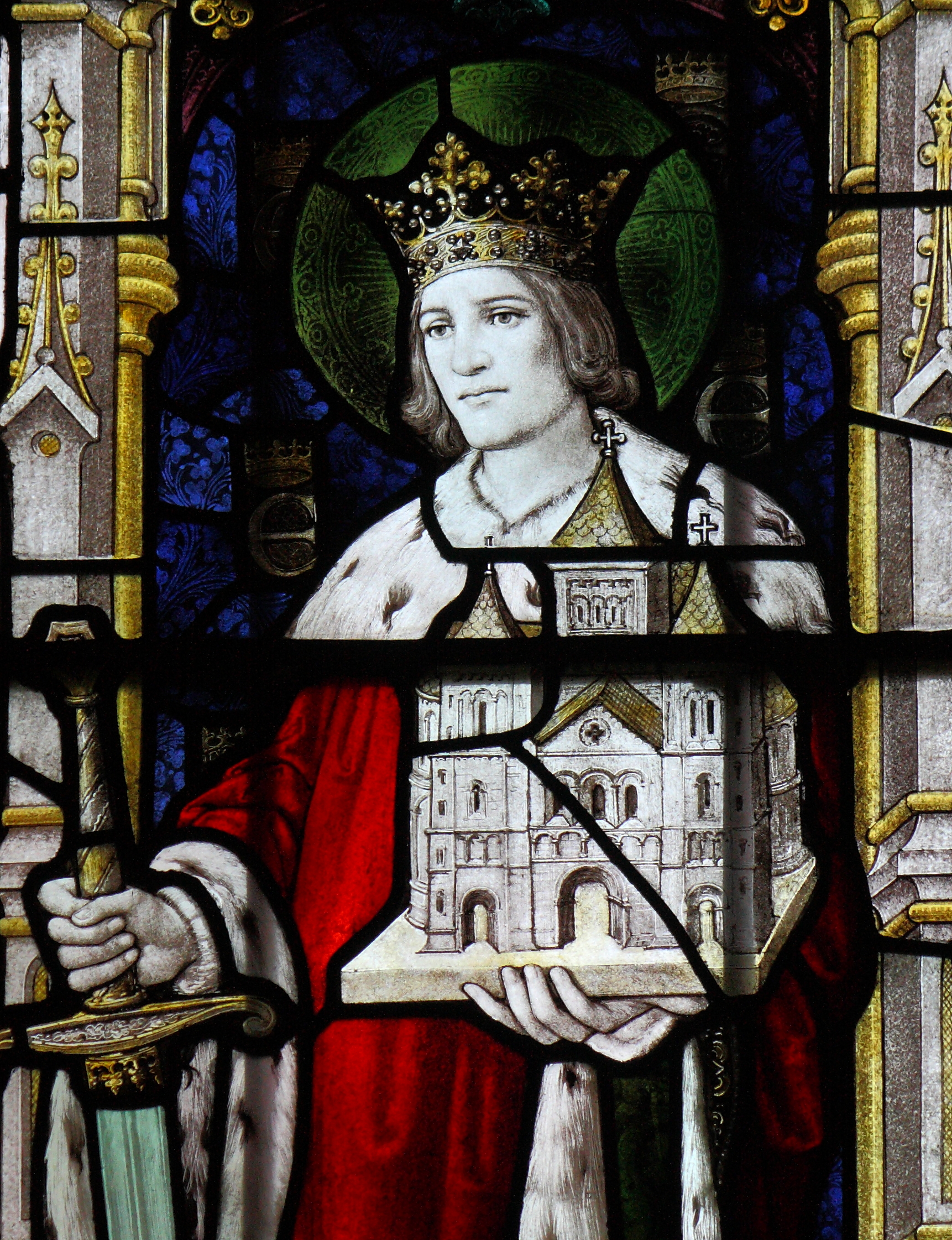
King Edwin of Northumbria (616–633)

Year 616 (DCXVI) was a leap year starting on Thursday of the Julian calendar. The denomination 616 for this year has been used since the early medieval period, when the Anno Domini calendar era became the prevalent method in Europe for naming years.

== Events ==
=== By place ===
==== Byzantine Empire ====
- Byzantine–Sassanid War of 602–628: The Jews of Jerusalem gain complete control over the city; much of Judea and Galilee becomes an autonomous Jewish province of the Persian Empire. The Jewish Temple is rebuilt by Nehemiah ben Hushiel (exilarch of Jerusalem), who establishes a High Priesthood.
- The Persian army under Shahin Vahmanzadegan destroys the city of Sardis, including its synagogue. Its importance is due to a highway, leading from the interior to the Aegean coast. Shahin marches through Anatolia, defeating the Byzantines numerous times.

==== Europe ====
- Adaloald, age 14, succeeds his father Agilulf as Lombard king of Italy. He reigns under his mother Theodelinda as regent. The Lombard Kingdom gradually begins to convert to Catholicism, and establishes peace with the Exarchate of the Byzantine Empire.
- King Sisebut orders in the Council of Toledo that Jews are to convert to Christianity. Children are taken from their parents and put in monasteries, where they learn the teaching of evangelism in the Visigothic Kingdom.

==== Britain ====
- King Rædwald of East Anglia conquers Northumbria (Northern England) at the Battle of the River Idle. King Æthelfrith is killed during the fighting and his children are forced to flee north. His heir, prince Eanfrith (age 26), seeks refuge with his mother's family, probably in Gododdin (modern Scotland), and moves further north into Pictland. Princes Oswald (age 12), Oswiu (age 4) and others escape to the court of King Eochaid Buide of Dál Riata, where they are converted to Christianity by the monks of Iona.
- Rædwald installs Edwin as king of Northumbria, effectively confirming him as bretwalda. He takes power in his native Deira and in Bernicia. His reign marks the domination of Northumbria as leading Anglo-Saxon state of the British Isles.
- February 24 – Æthelberht, the first Christian Anglo-Saxon king, dies in Kent after a 26-year reign. He is succeeded by his pagan son, Eadbald, who promptly marries his stepmother Emma, in accordance with pre-Christian custom.
- King Sæberht of Essex dies after a 12-year reign, and is succeeded by his son Sexred. He rules conjointly with his two brothers Sæward and Sigeberht; they throw out the Christian missionaries and return to paganism.
- The Battle of Chester (Old Welsh: Guaith Caer Legion; Welsh: Brwydr Caer), which separates the (West) Welsh from the 'North' Welsh of Cumbria - marking the formation of Wales, is fought (approximate date).
- Cadfan ap Iago succeeds his father Iago ap Beli, as king of Gwynedd (Wales) (approximate date).

=== By topic ===
==== Religion ====
- Mellitus, bishop of London, is exiled by Sexred and his pagan brothers (Sæward and Sigeberht). He is forced to take refuge in Gaul, and returns to England the following year.
- The Quraish clans begins to boycott Muhammad and Banu Hashem, in order to put pressure on his Muslim followers and his Islamic preachings.
- A shrine on the site of the future Westminster Abbey (London) is founded (approximate date).

== Births ==
- September 28 – Javanshir, king of Caucasian Albania (d. 680)
- Grimoald the Elder, Mayor of the Palace of Austrasia (d. 657)

== Deaths ==
- February 24 – Æthelberht, king (bretwalda) of Kent
- Æthelfrith, king of Northumbria (approximate date)
- Agilulf, king of the Lombards (approximate date)
- Anastasius, Coptic Patriarch of Alexandria
- Gundoald, Bavarian nobleman
- Iago ap Beli, king of Gwynedd (approximate date)
- John the Merciful, Patriarch of Alexandria
- Nechtan II, king of the Picts (approximate date)
- Sæbert, king of Essex (approximate date)
- Secundus of Non, Lombard abbot
- Selyf ap Cynan, king of Powys
- Yŏn T'aejo, prime minister of Goguryeo (approximate date)
- Yuan Humo, empress of Northern Zhou
- Yuwen Shu, general of the Sui dynasty
