= 694 =

Calendar year

694 in various calendars
Gregorian calendar	694; DCXCIV
Ab urbe condita	1447
Armenian calendar	143; ԹՎ ՃԽԳ
Assyrian calendar	5444
Balinese saka calendar	615–616
Bengali calendar	100–101
Berber calendar	1644
Buddhist calendar	1238
Burmese calendar	56
Byzantine calendar	6202–6203
Chinese calendar	癸巳年 (Water Snake); 3391 or 3184 — to — 甲午年 (Wood Horse); 3392 or 3185
Coptic calendar	410–411
Discordian calendar	1860
Ethiopian calendar	686–687
Hebrew calendar	4454–4455
- Hindu calendars
Vikram Samvat	750–751
Shaka Samvat	615–616
Kali Yuga	3794–3795
Holocene calendar	10694
Iranian calendar	72–73
Islamic calendar	74–75
Japanese calendar	Shuchō 9 (朱鳥９年)
Javanese calendar	586–587
Julian calendar	694; DCXCIV
Korean calendar	3027
Minguo calendar	1218 before ROC 民前1218年
Nanakshahi calendar	−774
Seleucid era	1005/1006 AG
Thai solar calendar	1236–1237
Tibetan calendar	ཆུ་མོ་སྦྲུལ་ལོ་ (female Water-Snake); 820 or 439 or −333 — to — ཤིང་ཕོ་རྟ་ལོ་ (male Wood-Horse); 821 or 440 or −332

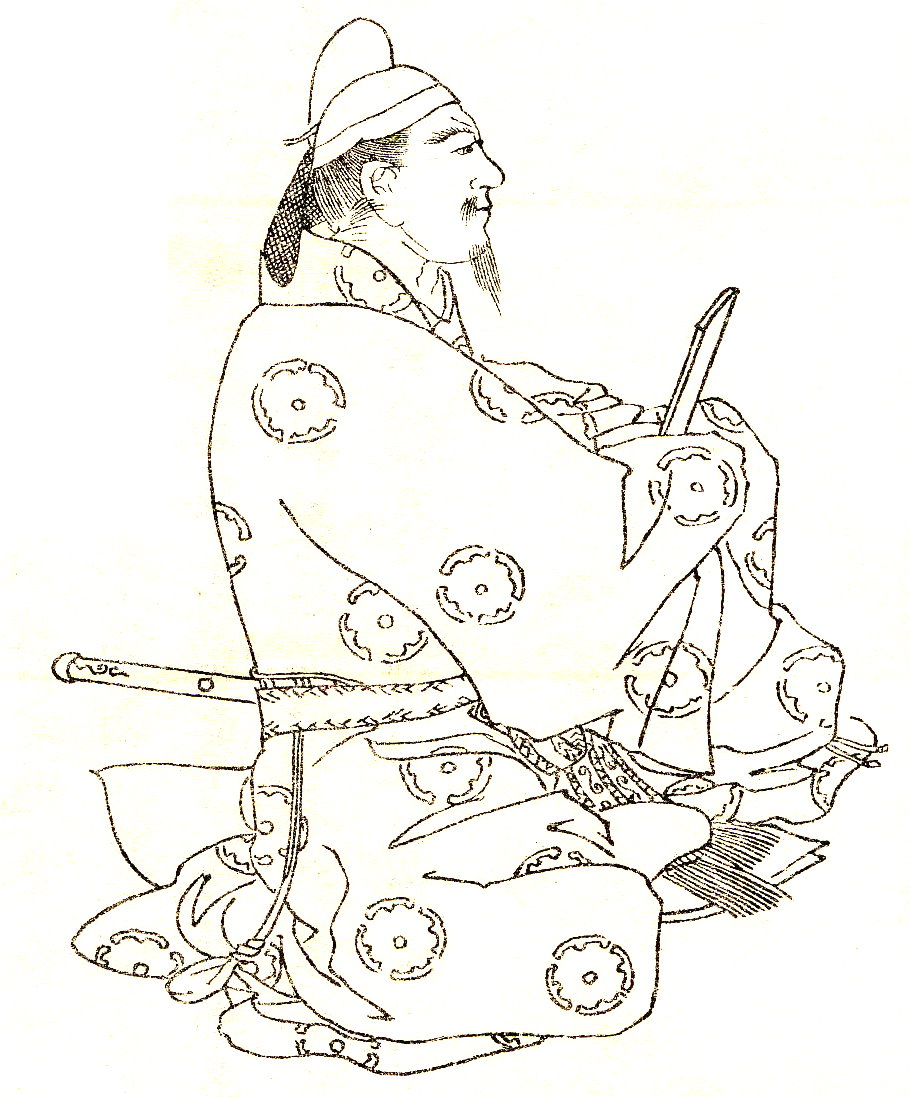
Fujiwara no Umakai (694–737)

Year 694 (DCXCIV) was a common year starting on Thursday of the Julian calendar. The denomination 694 for this year has been used since the early medieval period, when the Anno Domini calendar era became the prevalent method in Europe for naming years.

== Events ==
=== By place ===
==== Byzantine Empire ====
- The Mardaites raid Muslim-held territories, from their chief stronghold Hagioupolis, in northern Syria (approximate date).

==== Europe ====
- November 9 – King Ergica of the Visigoths accuses the Jews of aiding the Muslims, and sentences all Jews to slavery.

==== Britain ====
- King Ine of Wessex attacks Kent, and extorts 30,000 pence from its people, in recompense for the murder of King Mul.
- King Sæbbi of Essex abdicates the throne, and is succeeded by his sons Sigeheard and Swæfred (approximate date).

==== Asia ====
- Asuka, imperial capital of Japan, is abandoned by Empress Jitō. She moves her court to Fujiwara-kyō (Nara Prefecture).
- Qapaghan Khan (694–716) succeeds his brother Illterish Khan, as ruler of the Eastern Turkic Khaganate (Central Asia).

== Births ==
- Fujiwara no Umakai, Japanese statesman (d. 737)
- Hammad Ar-Rawiya, Arab scholar (approximate date)

== Deaths ==
- Clovis IV, King of the Franks (b. 677)
- Coenred, king of Dorset (approximate date)
- Rodoald, duke of Friuli (Italy)
- Xue Huai-yi, Chinese Buddhist monk
