= Sigeberht the Little =

Sigeberht the Little was king of Essex from 623? to 653. A Sigeberht was the son of Sæward, who was slain in battle against forces from Wessex in 623(?), and father of later king Sighere, but Yorke thought it more likely this was his successor, Sigeberht the Good. Sigeberht the Little was considered a pagan and most likely allied with Penda of Mercia in 635, who was also a pagan.

After his death, he was succeeded by his relative, Sigeberht the Good.

Preceded by Sexred; Sæward and another	King of Essex; 623?–653	Succeeded by Sigeberht the Good
