= Offa of Essex =

King of Essex

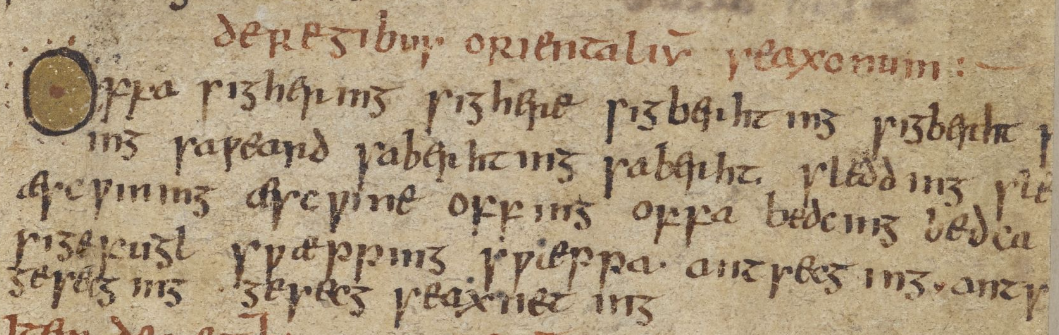
The ancestry of Offa in MS BL Add. 23211, reaching back to the god Seaxneat.

Offa was King of Essex. D. H. Kirby dates his reign as 705 to 709. Simon Keynes dates it c.694 to 709, when he went on a pilgrimage to Rome, where he died as a monk, along with Cenred, King of Mercia. He may have been co-king with Swæfred. He was the son of Sighere, who had died in about 690.

In his Historia ecclesiastica gentis Anglorum, Bede described him as "a youth of most lovely age and beauty, and most earnestly desired by all his nation to be their king. He, with like devotion, quit his wife, lands, kindred and country, for Christ and for the Gospel, that he might receive an hundredfold in this life, and in the world to Come life everlasting. He also, when they came to the holy places at Rome, receiving the tonsure, and adopting a monastic life, attained the long wished-for sight of the blessed apostles in heaven."

A charter related to land in Warwickshire (S64) is attributed to him, although in it he is described as King of Mercia rather than Essex. This may be an inaccurate copy based on an authentic charter by Cenred of Mercia. By charter S 1784 dated 704-9, which is probably authentic, Offa grants land in Hemel Hempstead to Waldhere, bishop of London.

He was succeeded by Saelred of Essex.

== Notes ==
| Preceded by Sigeheard and Swæfred | King of Essex c. 709 first jointly with Swæfred then alone | Succeeded by Saelred |
