= Sæberht of Essex =

7th century king of the East Saxons

Sæberht
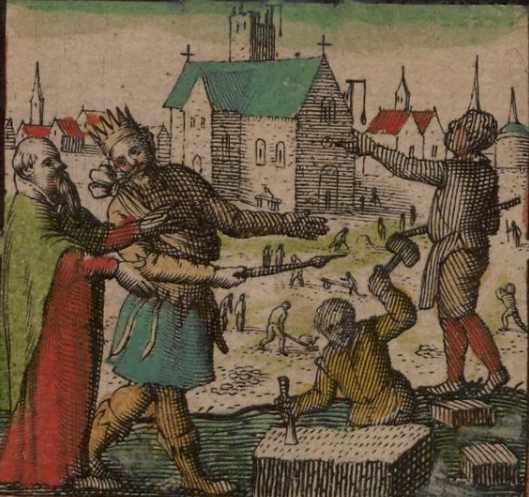
- Depiction of Sæberht from John Speed's map of the Heptarchy (The Theatre of the Empire of Great Britaine, 1611)

King of the East Saxons
- Reign: c. 604 – c. 616
- Predecessor: Sledd
- Successor: his three sons
- Died: 616
- Issue: Sexred; Sæward another son
- Father: Sledd
- Mother: Ricula, sister of King Æthelberht of Kent

Sæberht, Saberht or Sæbert (d. c. 616) was the King of Essex from c. 604 to c. 616, in succession of his father King Sledd. He is known as the first East Saxon king to have been converted to Christianity.

The principal source for his reign is the early 8th-century Historia Ecclesiastica gentis Anglorum by Bede, who claims to have derived his information about the missionary work of Mellitus among the East Saxons from Abbot Albinus of Canterbury through the London priest Nothhelm, later Archbishop of Canterbury (d. 739). Other sources include the Anglo-Saxon Chronicle, an East Saxon genealogy possibly of the late 9th century, and a handful of genealogies and regnal lists written down by Anglo-Norman historians.

== Family ==
The genealogies and regnal lists are unanimous in describing Sæberht as the son of Sledd, who may have been regarded as the founder of the East Saxon dynasty. According to Bede, Sæberht's mother was Ricula, a sister of King Æthelberht of Kent. Bede omits the names of Sæberht's three sons, who succeeded him but two, Sexred and Sæward, are named in the genealogy of Add MS 23211.

== Conversion and succession ==
In 604, the churchman Mellitus was consecrated by Augustine as bishop in the province of the East Saxons, which had a capital at London, making him the first Saxon Bishop of London. Bede tells that Sæberht converted to Christianity in 604 and was baptised by Mellitus, while his sons remained pagan. Sæberht then allowed the bishopric to be established. The episcopal church which was built in London was probably founded by Æthelberht, rather than Sæberht, though a charter which claims to be a grant of lands from Æthelberht to Mellitus is a forgery.

== Death and burial ==
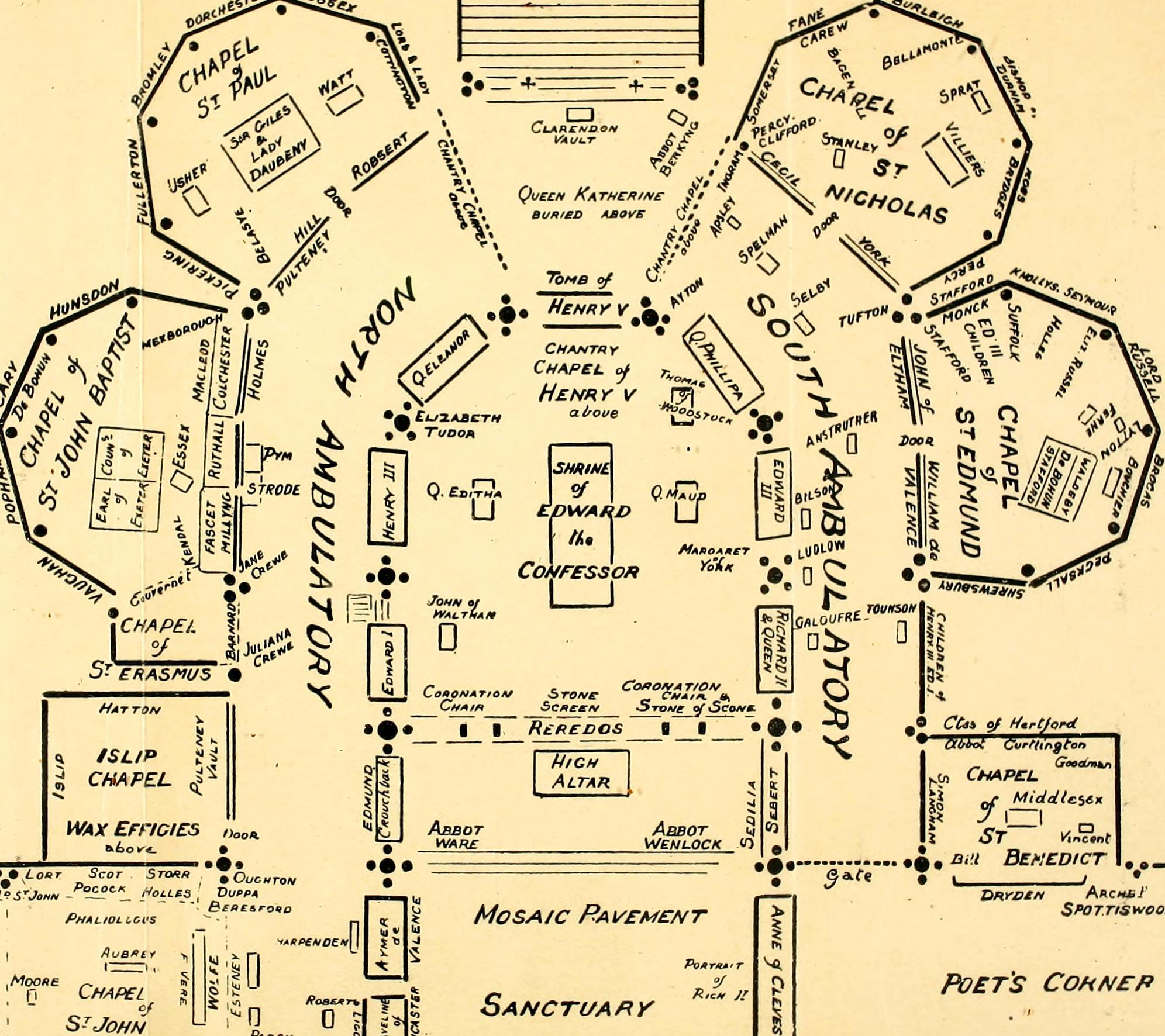
1906 plan of Westminster Abbey showing Sæberht's putative tomb by the entrance of the south ambulatory

Both Æthelberht and Sæberht died in 616, leaving the Gregorian mission without strong patrons. Sæberht's pagan sons drove Mellitus from London. According to Bede's explanation, this happened because Mellitus refused the brothers' request for a taste of the sacramental bread.

=== Westminster Abbey ===
Later medieval legend claimed that Sæberht and his wife Ethelgoda had founded a monastery in London dedicated to St Peter at the site of the present Westminster Abbey, and that they had been buried in the church there. In the reign of Henry III, during rebuilding work in 1245-1272, their supposed remains were transferred into a tomb which the king had especially erected for them in the Chapter House, close to the entrance of the Royal Chapels. The King's remains were reportedly still clothed in royal robes and a ruby thumb ring was seen. In 1308, the bones were said to have been relocated once again to a marble tomb which still stands today in the south ambulatory. There is no genuine evidence to support this tradition however, and modern scholars cast doubt on the claim that Sæberht's bones were ever genuinely entombed here.

=== Great Burstead ===
There is a local tradition that Sæberht lived, and was buried at Great Burstead in Essex.

=== Prittlewell burial ===
In 2003 a high-status Anglo-Saxon tomb was discovered at Prittlewell, just north of Southend in Essex. The artefacts found were of such a quality that archaeologists surmised that Prittlewell was a tomb of one of the Kings of Essex, and the discovery of golden foil crosses indicates that the inhabitant was an early Christian. As the initial evidence pointed to an early seventh-century date, Sæberht was considered the most likely candidate for the burial, although other possibilities such as his Christian grandson Sigeberht the Good, or an unknown individual of high status, were not ruled out. However, carbon dating techniques later indicated a revised date in the late 6th century. In May 2019, it was reported that a team of 40 specialists from the Museum of London Archaeology (MOLA) now believe the tomb could have belonged to Seaxa, Sæberht's brother. Carbon dating had indicated that the tomb was built between 575 and 605, at least 11 years before Sæberht's death. Further details of the latest research have been published on the MOLA website.

Preceded by Sledd	King of Essex c. 604 – c. 616	Succeeded by Sexred, Saeward, another
