= Othona =

Roman fort

- Essex, England, UK
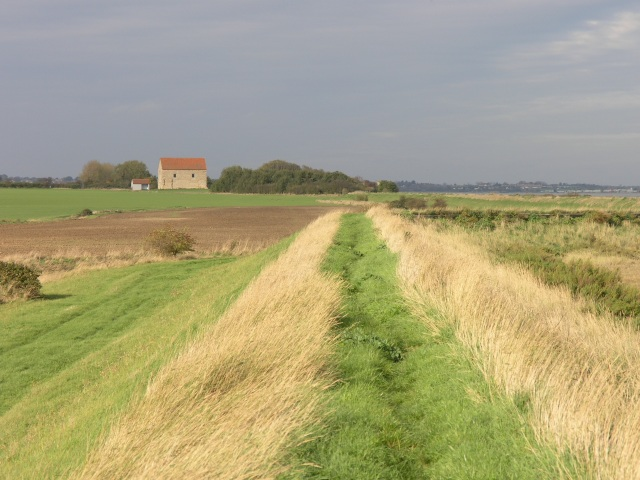
- View looking north towards the Chapel of St Peter-on-the-Wall on the site of the Roman fort

Location
- Location in Essex
- Coordinates: 51.735°N 0.940°E
- Grid reference: TM031081

Othona or Othonae was an ancient Roman fort of the Saxon Shore at the sea's edge near the modern village of Bradwell-on-Sea in Essex, England. The Old English name Ythanceaster for the locality derives from the Roman name.

== History ==
The fort of Othona is in a typical late 3rd-century style, and was possibly constructed during or shortly prior to the Carausian Revolt, making it contemporary with the forts at Dubris (Dover), Portus Lemanis (Lympne) and Gariannonum (Burgh Castle). According to the early 5th-century Notitia Dignitatum, which is the only contemporary document mentioning Othona, the fort was garrisoned by a numerus fortensium ("numerus of the brave ones").

== Location and construction ==
Othona's location at the edge of the Dengie Peninsula was ideal for control of the estuaries of the rivers Blackwater and Colne, the latter leading to the important city of Camulodunum (now Colchester). The fort's shape was roughly trapezoidal, with rounded corners. The stone rampart was 4.2 metres thick, indicating a tall superstructure, and enclosed over 2 hectares (4.9 acres). A single exterior ditch surrounded the site. Although some of the Roman building material was reused in the 7th-century Chapel of St Peter-on-the-Wall, enough of the rampart survived until the 17th century, when it was described by the local historian Philemon Holland as a "huge ruin". It has since been largely swallowed by the sea, leaving scant remains on view.

== Christianity ==
The Othona Community is a Christian community and retreat centre based at Bradwell and at Burton Bradstock in West Dorset. It was founded in 1946 by Norman Motley, a Church of England priest who had served as an RAF chaplain during the Second World War, and after the war as rector of St Michael, Cornhill, 1956–1980.

Othona is a titular bishopric of the Roman Catholic Church. Vincent Nichols was Titular Bishop of Othona, (1992–2000).

Bishop of Bradwell is an episcopal title used by an area bishop of the Church of England Diocese of Chelmsford since 1968.

The Chapel of St Peter-on-the-Wall is a mid-7th-century chapel that has survived from the period of the evangelisation of the Kingdom of Essex. The chapel belongs to Chelmsford Cathedral and is in regular use for Church of England services and by the Othona Community.

== Sources ==
- Fields, Nic (2006). Rome's Saxon Shore – Coastal Defences of Roman Britain AD 250–500 (Fortress 56). Osprey Publishing. ISBN 978-1-84603-094-9.
- Johnston, David E.; et al. (1977). "The Saxon Shore" (PDF). CBA Research Report (18).
