= Sigered of Essex =

Last King of Essex

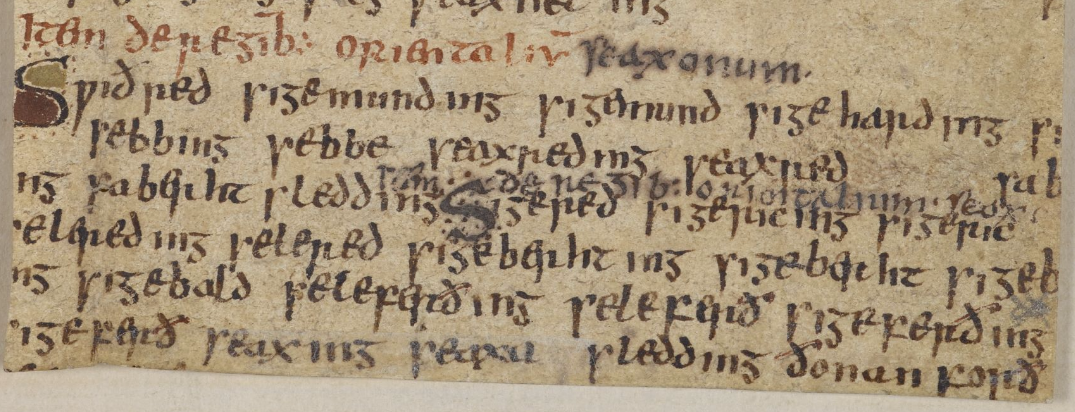
The ancestry of Sigered in MS BL Add. 23211.

Sigered of Essex was the last king of Essex from 798 to 825. The son of Sigeric of Essex, Sigered became king when his father abdicated the throne.

In 812 Sigered was reduced from king to duke by his Mercian overlords. In 825 he finally ceded the kingdom of Essex to Egbert of Wessex.

There are some records of Sigered's possible vassalage to Wessex, but they are not very clear or conclusive.

One source is a charter issued by Egbert in 825, which grants land to a monastery in Rochester . The charter mentions Sigered as “duke of the East Saxons”, and says that he consented to the grant along with other nobles. This shows that Sigered was still in power in 825, but under Egbert's authority.

Another source states in the year 825, Egbert of Wessex “conquered the kingdom of Kent and Sussex and Surrey and Essex”. This shows that Sigered surrendered his kingdom (duchy) to Egbert without a fight, and it talks about him being a vassal.

However, another version of the Chronicle says that in the same year, Egbert “fought against Beornwulf and the Mercians at Ellendun”, and then “sent his son Æthelwulf with an army into Kent” . Though according to this chronicle it never mentions Essex, it is instead implied that Kent and Essex were both conquered, and may refer to them as East Saxons.

== Sources ==
- Lee, Sidney, ed. (1897). "Sigered (fl.799)" . Dictionary of National Biography. Vol. 52. London: Smith, Elder & Co.

Regnal titles
Preceded by Sigeric	King of Essex; 798–812	Demoted to duke
Titles of nobility
New title	Duke of Essex; 812–825	Succeeded by Egbert
