= Plague of 664 =

7th century epidemic, British Isles

The plague of 664 was an epidemic that affected Great Britain and Ireland in 664 AD, during the first recorded plague pandemic. It was the first recorded epidemic in English history, and coincided with a solar eclipse. It was considered by later sources as "The Yellow Plague of 664" and said to have lasted for twenty or twenty-five years, causing widespread mortality, social disruption, and abandonment of religious faith. The disease responsible was probably bubonic plague – part of the First Plague Pandemic – or else smallpox. The general absence of rat bones in archeological sites may suggest that the plague was partially pneumonic.

== Chronology ==
According to the Irish Annals of Tigernach, the plague was preceded by a solar eclipse on 1 May 664. The path of the total eclipse started in the Pacific, crossed the Gulf of Mexico, swept along the eastern coast of North America, crossed Ireland and Britain, and continued on into Central Europe. Bede also mentioned the eclipse, dating it incorrectly to 3 May, possibly to better align with the Roman (Dionysian) calendar. The Irish sources claimed that there was also an earthquake in Britain.

The plague struck first in Kent, possibly carrying off Archbishop Deusdedit and King Earconbert, who Bede records as having both died on 14 July 664. It then spread to Essex, causing widespread rejection of Christianity and reversion to paganism under Kings Sighere and Sæbbi.

The pestilence reached Ireland on 1 August 664, arriving first at Mag Nitha, among the Fothairt in Leinster. Ireland and Great Britain were equally affected by the disease, though the little written evidence that has survived was written by the English.

The plague also reached Northumbria that autumn, killing Bishop Cedd in Lastingham on October 23, 664, and Bishop Tuda and Boisil, prior of Melrose, around the same time. The swift transmission of the disease from south to north implies transmission via ship rather than overland travel.

After 664, the plague declined but outbreaks continued, such as at Gilling between c. 666–669, Barking between c. 666–675, Lichfield in 672, Ely in 680, and a more generalized return during 684–687. After 687, contemporary records of plague-related deaths and healing miracles cease, and the population seems to have recovered by the early 700s.

== Contemporary accounts ==
Bede, writing of the plague, said that it "ravaged the country far and near, and destroyed a great multitude of men," and that "scarcely any inhabitants [were] left in villages and places which had been thickly populated, and some towns were wholly deserted." Though the predominant theory of plague was divine retribution, Bede does not assign it any cause. Historian John Maddicott suggests that "the plagues of the seventh century were too widespread, and came too evidently in a period of religious growth and prosperity, to be easily seen as the result of God’s anger turned against a particular people."

According to Adomnan of Iona, a contemporary Irish abbot and saint, the plague ravaged most of the British Isles excepting a large part of modern Scotland. Adomnan considered the plague a divine punishment for sins and believed that the Picts and Irish who lived in northern Great Britain were spared from the plague due to the intercession of St. Columba who had founded monasteries among them. Adomnan personally walked among victims of the plague and claimed that neither he nor his companions fell sick.

A few specific accounts of the disease have survived. Cuthbert, an Irish monk, was reportedly "seized stricken down with a plague which at that time carried off very many throughout the length and breadth of Britain." It is possible that a groin bubo grew on Cuthbert's thigh. The wife of King Ecgfrith, Etheldreda, died with a tumor that released a "noxious moisture," another possible instance of the Black Plague in Ireland. Abbess Æthelthryth of Ely succumbed to a "large tumor under her jaw," likely a plague bubo.

== Legacy ==
This plague, and the memory of it, provided the inspiration for Julius Caesar's legendary cursed sword, Crocea Mors (Yellow Death), in Geoffrey of Monmouth's Historia Regum Britanniae.

== See also ==
- First plague pandemic
- Plague of Mohill, first recorded Irish plague
