= Chapel of St Peter-on-the-Wall =

Grade I listed chapel in Essex, England

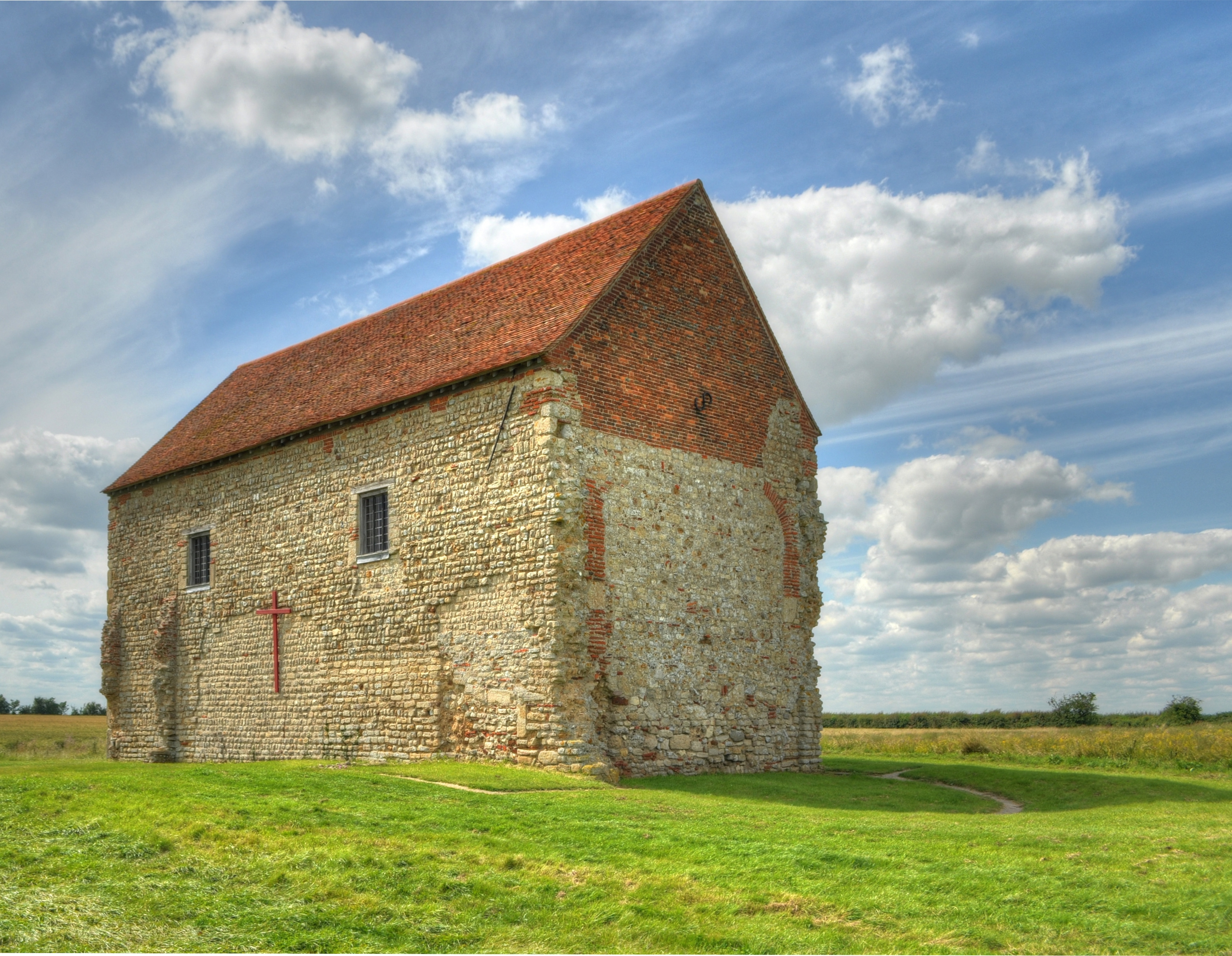

- Location within England
- 51°44′07″N 0°56′24″E
- Location: Essex
- Country: England
- Denomination: Church of England
- Website: www.bradwellchapel.org

History
- Status: Active
- Founded: 654-662
- Founder: Cedd

Architecture
- Functional status: Chapel
- Heritage designation: Grade I listed building
- Designated: 30 December 1959

Administration
- Diocese: Diocese of Chelmsford
- Parish: looked after by the parish church of St Thomas Bradwell-on-Sea

The Chapel of St Peter-on-the-Wall, Bradwell-on-Sea, is a Christian church dating from the years 660–662 and among the oldest largely intact churches in England. It is open every day for visitors and has many public services throughout the year, see events diary at The chapel of St Peters on the wall | Bradwell chapel. Services at St Peters are arranged by the Chaplain Revd Steven Poss and is maintained for Chelmsford Cathedral by the parish church of St Thomas St Thomas’ church Bradwell-on-Sea - A Church Near You The Chapel is also used by the nearby Othona Community. It is a Grade I listed building.

== History ==
According to Bede (who wrote his history in the early 8th century), a 'city' named Ythanceaster existed on the River Penta. The Chapel of St Peter-on-the-Wall was almost certainly originally built by Bishop Cedd in 654. It was an Anglo-Celtic church for the East Saxons, set astride the ruins of the abandoned Roman fort of Othona. The current structure was most likely built around 654–662, incorporating the Roman bricks and stones. In 653, Cedd travelled south from Lindisfarne to spread Christianity at the behest of Sigeberht the Good, then King of the East Saxons, and, having been ordained as a bishop, returned the next year in order to build the chapel, and probably others, too. Following the death of Cedd in October 664 from plague, the chapel became part of the Diocese of London.

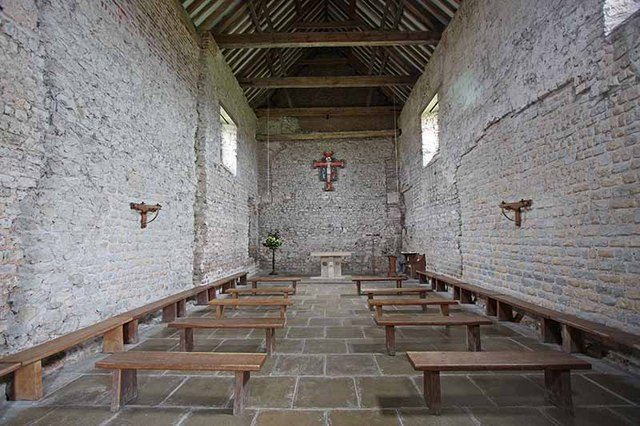
Interior view.

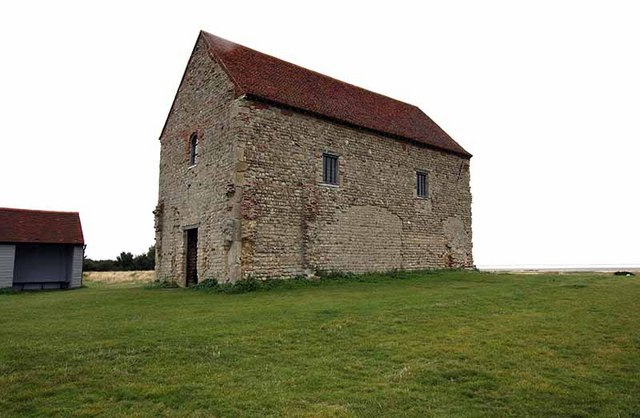
From the side.

No further record exists of the chapel being used until 1442, when the local clergy reported to the Bishop of London that it had been expanded slightly, with a small tower above the porch with a bell in it. However they did not know of its origins and it was unusable, having been burnt. It was repaired and returned to regular use alongside the parish church in Bradwell-on-Sea until at least the Tudor period (16th century) before falling into disuse as a church again and being used as a barn—the position of the wide barn doorway, now filled in, can be seen on the south side of the nave.

In 1920, it was restored and reconsecrated as a chapel. Following wartime damage it was once again restored by the architect Laurence King. It was designated as a Grade I listed building in 1959.

In May 2023, a book entitled St Peter-on-the Wall Landscape and Heritage on the Essex Coast was published. It reflected concerns over the planned Bradwell B nuclear power station, which it was feared would damage the local environment and the setting of the Chapel.

The chapel belongs to Chelmsford Cathedral.
