= Swæfred of Essex =

Swæfred (or Suebred) was joint king of Essex along with his brother, Sigeheard, from 694 to 709, succeeding their father Sæbbi.

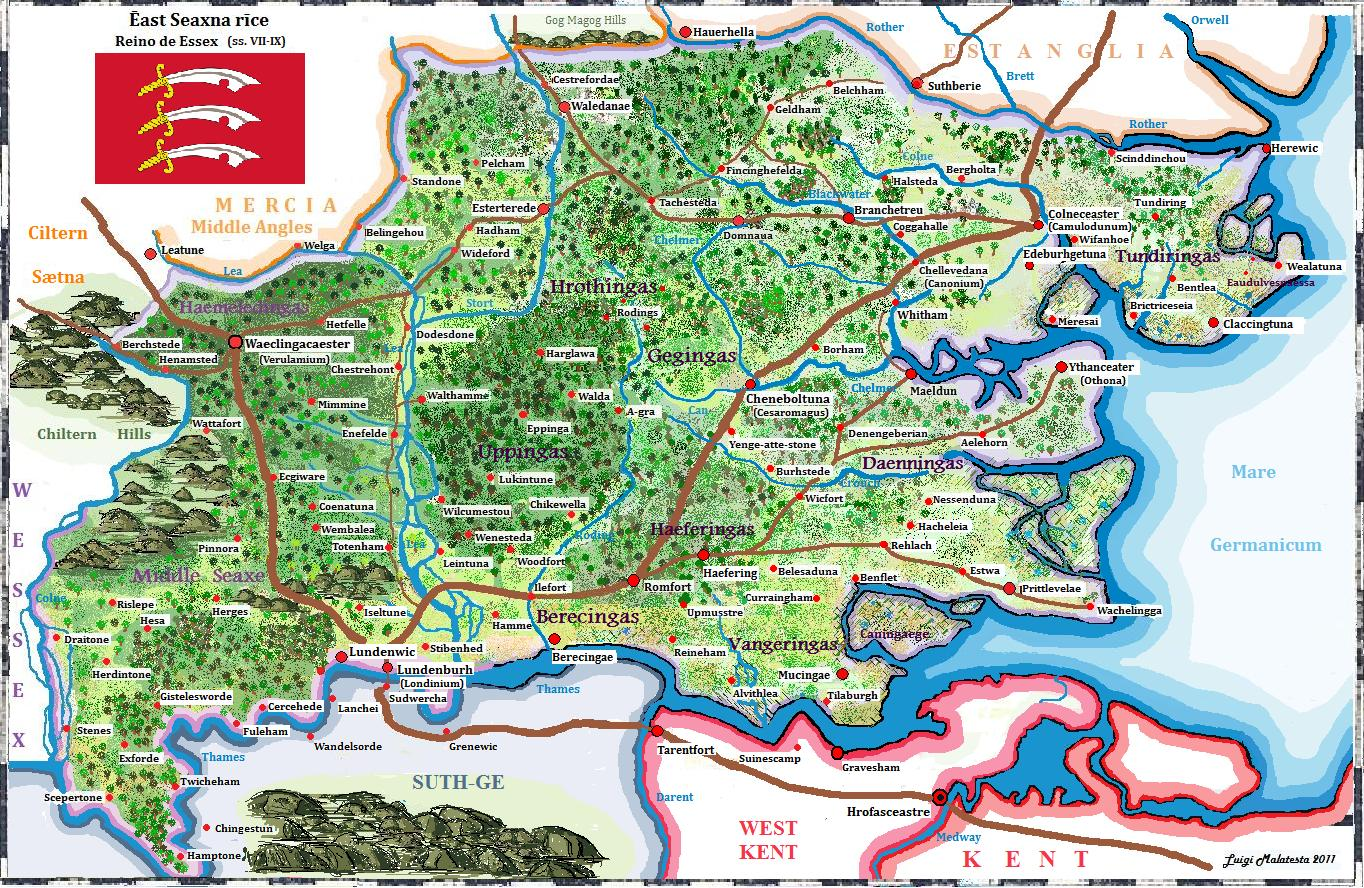
Essex in the Early Anglo-Saxon Period

== Biography ==
In 705, they became estranged from King Ine of Wessex for sheltering his rivals to the throne. At the Synod of Brentford, they agreed to banish Ine's rivals from Essex in return for Ine's promise not to attack Essex. The exact chronology of the later years of their rule is uncertain. It isn't known whether they governed together until 709 or if Swæfred died before then.

Swæfred issued two charters related to land in Nazeing for the establishment of a nunnery, although these charters only survive in later copies. He issued a further charter related to land in the Dengie peninsula. A charter related to land in Twickenham (S65) is attributed to him. This charter has been described as possibly spurious, although more recent writers have concluded that there is no reason to doubt its authenticity.

By 709, Offa, son of their father's co-king and later rival, Sighere, was at least heir apparent and perhaps joint ruler of Essex when he traveled with King Cenred of Mercia to Rome. He would succeed Swæfred and Sigeheard.

== Notes ==
Preceded by Sæbbi	King of Essex; 694 – c. 709 ruled jointly with Sigeheard and later with Offa	Succeeded by Offa
