= 715 =

Calendar year

715 in various calendars
- Gregorian calendar: 715; DCCXV
- Ab urbe condita: 1468
- Armenian calendar: 164; ԹՎ ՃԿԴ
- Assyrian calendar: 5465
- Balinese saka calendar: 636–637
- Bengali calendar: 121–122
- Berber calendar: 1665
- Buddhist calendar: 1259
- Burmese calendar: 77
- Byzantine calendar: 6223–6224
- Chinese calendar: 甲寅年 (Wood Tiger); 3412 or 3205 — to — 乙卯年 (Wood Rabbit); 3413 or 3206
- Coptic calendar: 431–432
- Discordian calendar: 1881
- Ethiopian calendar: 707–708
- Hebrew calendar: 4475–4476
- Hindu calendars
- Vikram Samvat: 771–772
- Shaka Samvat: 636–637
- Kali Yuga: 3815–3816
- Holocene calendar: 10715
- Iranian calendar: 93–94
- Islamic calendar: 96–97
- Japanese calendar: Wadō 8 / Reiki 1 (霊亀元年)
- Javanese calendar: 608–609
- Julian calendar: 715; DCCXV
- Korean calendar: 3048
- Minguo calendar: 1197 before ROC 民前1197年
- Nanakshahi calendar: −753
- Seleucid era: 1026/1027 AG
- Thai solar calendar: 1257–1258
- Tibetan calendar: ཤིང་ཕོ་སྟག་ལོ་ (male Wood-Tiger); 841 or 460 or −312 — to — ཤིང་མོ་ཡོས་ལོ་ (female Wood-Hare); 842 or 461 or −311

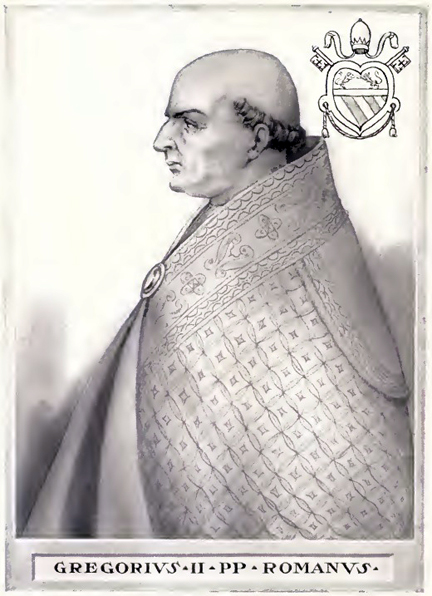
Pope Gregory II (715–731)

Year 715 (DCCXV) was a common year starting on Tuesday of the Julian calendar. The denomination 715 for this year has been used since the early medieval period, when the Anno Domini calendar era became the prevalent method in Europe for naming years.

== Events ==
=== By place ===
==== Byzantine Empire ====
- May – Emperor Anastasios II is deposed in an army mutiny, and succeeded by Theodosius III, a tax-collector from the theme of Opsikion (modern Turkey). After a six-month siege, Theodosius and his troops take Constantinople; Anastasios is forced to abdicate the throne, and retires to a monastery in Thessaloniki (Macedonia).

==== Europe ====
- September 26 – Battle of Compiègne: Ragenfrid, mayor of the palace of Neustria and Burgundy (appointed by King Dagobert III), defeats Theudoald in the first battle of the Frankish civil war, following the death of Pepin II (of Herstal).
- Dagobert III dies of an illness and is succeeded by Chilperic II, son of Childeric II, as king of Neustria. Charles Martel is freed from prison at Cologne, and is proclaimed Mayor of the Palace of Austrasia at the capital Metz.

==== Britain ====
- Battle of Woden's Burg: Kings Ine of Wessex and Ceolred of Mercia clash at Woden's Burg (Wiltshire).
- King Nechtan mac Der-Ilei invites the Northumbrian clergy to establish Christianity amongst the Picts.

==== Arabian Empire ====
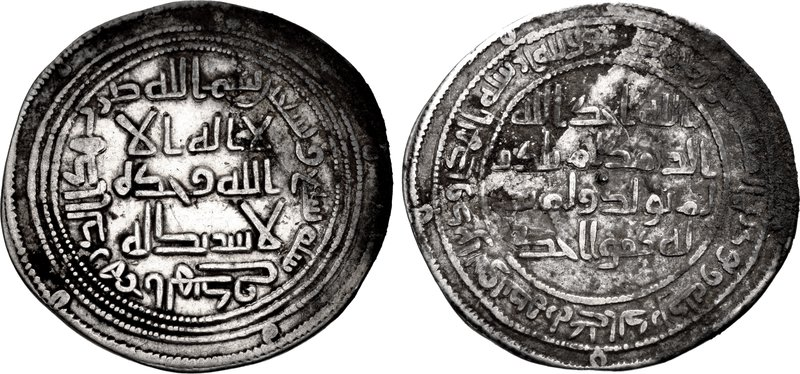
Dirham of the Umayyad caliph Sulayman (r. 715–717)

- February 23 – Caliph Al-Walid I dies at Damascus after a 10-year reign, and is succeeded by his brother Sulayman ibn Abd al-Malik. During his rule the Umayyad Caliphate reaches its greatest height, with successful campaigns undertaken in Transoxiana (Central Asia), Sindh (Pakistan), Hispania and against the Byzantine Empire.
- Umayyad conquest of Hispania: Arabs led by Tariq ibn Ziyad advance from the area La Rioja (modern-day Spain), and conquer the fortress city of León.

==== Egypt ====
- Egyptian military commander Abd al-Malik ibn Rifa'a al-Fahmi is appointed governor of Egypt for the Umayyad Caliphate.

==== Japan ====
- Empress Genmei abdicates the throne after an 8-year reign, in which she has built a replica of the Chinese imperial palace at Japan's new capital, Nara. Genmei is succeeded by her daughter Genshō.

=== By topic ===
==== Religion ====
- April 9 – Pope Constantine I dies at Rome after a 7-year reign. He is succeeded by Gregory II as the 89th pope of the Catholic Church.
- Winning, an Irish monk, lands at the mouth of the River Garnock in Scotland, and establishes a community or cell of monks (termed cella or "Kil" in Gaelic).
- The newly-appointed Patriarch Germanus I of Constantinople organises a council propagating Dyothelitism, and attempts to improve relations with the Armenian Apostolic Church.
- Approximate date – Tewkesbury Abbey is founded on the site of an ancient hermitage in England, by the noble brothers Oddo and Doddo.

== Births ==
- Fujiwara no Matate, Japanese nobleman (d. 766)
- Stephen II, pope of the Catholic Church (d. 757)
- Stephen the Younger, Byzantine theologian (or 713)

== Deaths ==
- February 23 – Al-Walid I, Muslim caliph (b. 668)
- April 9 – Constantine I, Pope of Rome (b. 664)
- July 9 – Naga, Japanese prince
- Dagobert III, king of the Franks (b. 699)
- Milburga, Anglo-Saxon abbess (approximate date)
- Muhammad ibn Qasim, Arab general (b. 695)
- Surya Devi, Indian princess
- Muhammad ibn Yusuf al-Thaqafi, Arab governor
- Qutayba ibn Muslim, Arab general (b. 669)

== Sources ==
- Kennedy, Hugh (1998). "Egypt as a province in the Islamic caliphate, 641–868". In Petry, Carl F. (ed.). Cambridge History of Egypt, Volume One: Islamic Egypt, 640–1517. Cambridge: Cambridge University Press. pp. 62–85. ISBN 0-521-47137-0.
