= Sexræd and Sæward of Essex =

7th century king of the East Saxons

Sexred, or Sexræd (d. 626?), and Sæward (Sæward of Essex) are two brothers who jointly served as king of the East Saxons after the death of their father Sæbert.

Their father converted to Christianity in 604, becoming the first Christian king of the East Saxons. When Sæberht died in c. 616? the two brothers ruled jointly as king, perhaps with another, said on no good authority to have been named Sigebert (Bromton, ap. Decem SS. col. 743) but perhaps the unplaced Seaxbald, father of Swithhelm. Both refused to accept Christianity, openly practised paganism and gave permission to his subjects to worship their idols. They repressed Christianity in favour of the indigenous English religion, allowing the worship of their people's native gods.

When the brothers saw Mellitus (d. 624), bishop of London, giving the eucharist to the people in church, it was commonly believed in the Venerable Bede's time that they said to him, "Why do you not offer us the white bread that you used to give to our father Saba, for so they called him, and which you still give to the people?" Mellitus answered that if they would be washed in the font they should have it, but that otherwise it would do them no good. But they said that they would not enter the font, for they did not need washing but refreshment. The matter was often explained to them by the bishop, who persisted in refusing their request. At last they grew angry and banished him from their kingdom. Not long afterwards they went out to fight with the West Saxons, their army being almost wholly destroyed (Bede, Hist. Eccl. ii. c. 5). This battle was fought against Cynegils and Cwichelm of Wessex, the West Saxon kings who invaded their territory with a larger force than the East Saxons could muster in or about 626. They and their brother were killed in a battle against the forces of Wessex.

They were succeeded by Sigeberht the Little. Some sources suggest that their direct successor was actually Sigeberht the Good.

== In popular culture ==
The first series of BBC Four comedy Detectorists follows a group of characters searching for Sexred's lost burial place, in the hope of uncovering a Saxon hoard.

Preceded by Sæberht	King of Essex; 616?–623? Joint king with Saeward and another brother	Succeeded by Sigeberht the Little
