= 614 =

Calendar year

614 in various calendars
- Gregorian calendar: 614; DCXIV
- Ab urbe condita: 1367
- Armenian calendar: 63; ԹՎ ԿԳ
- Assyrian calendar: 5364
- Balinese saka calendar: 535–536
- Bengali calendar: 20–21
- Berber calendar: 1564
- Buddhist calendar: 1158
- Burmese calendar: −24
- Byzantine calendar: 6122–6123
- Chinese calendar: 癸酉年 (Water Rooster); 3311 or 3104 — to — 甲戌年 (Wood Dog); 3312 or 3105
- Coptic calendar: 330–331
- Discordian calendar: 1780
- Ethiopian calendar: 606–607
- Hebrew calendar: 4374–4375
- Hindu calendars
- Vikram Samvat: 670–671
- Shaka Samvat: 535–536
- Kali Yuga: 3714–3715
- Holocene calendar: 10614
- Iranian calendar: 8 BP – 7 BP
- Islamic calendar: 8 BH – 7 BH
- Japanese calendar: N/A
- Javanese calendar: 504–505
- Julian calendar: 614; DCXIV
- Korean calendar: 2947
- Minguo calendar: 1298 before ROC 民前1298年
- Nanakshahi calendar: −854
- Seleucid era: 925/926 AG
- Thai solar calendar: 1156–1157
- Tibetan calendar: ཆུ་མོ་བྱ་ལོ་ (female Water-Bird); 740 or 359 or −413 — to — ཤིང་ཕོ་ཁྱི་ལོ་ (male Wood-Dog); 741 or 360 or −412

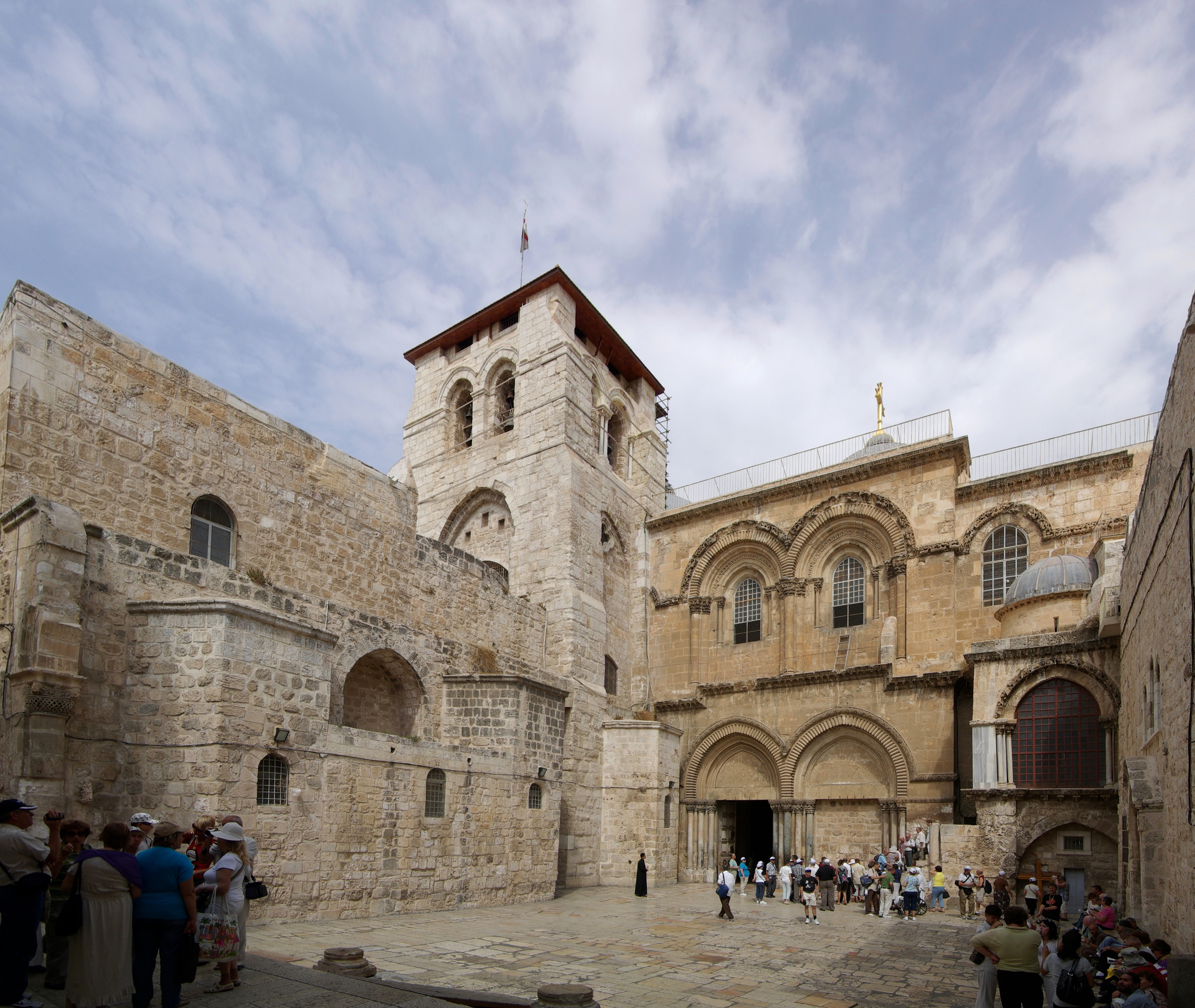
The Church of the Holy Sepulchre (Jerusalem)

Year 614 (DCXIV) was a common year starting on Tuesday of the Julian calendar. The denomination 614 for this year has been used since the early medieval period, when the Anno Domini calendar era became the prevalent method in Europe for naming years.

== Events ==
=== By place ===
==== Byzantine Empire ====
- Byzantine–Sasanian War of 602–628:
  - The Levantine cities of Caesarea Maritima, Arsuf, and Tiberias surrender on terms to the Sasanians.
  - Sasanian conquest of Jerusalem: A Persian–Judaean army (26,000 men) commanded by Shahrbaraz captures and sacks Jerusalem, after a 20-day siege against the Byzantine Empire. Somewhere between 57,000 and 66,500 citizens are slain; another 35,000 are enslaved, including the Patriarch Zacharias. Many churches in the city (including the "Church of the Resurrection" or Holy Sepulchre) are burned, and numerous relics, including the True Cross, the Holy Lance, and the Holy Sponge, are carried off to the Persian capital Ctesiphon.
- The Persians destroy the Ghassanid Kingdom (Arabia), a vassal state of the Byzantine Empire (approximate date).

==== Europe ====
- October 18 – King Chlothar II promulgates the Edict of Paris (Edictum Chlotacharii), a sort of Frankish Magna Carta that defends the rights of the Frankish nobles and the church, and regulates the appointment of counts (secular officials in charge of law courts, collecting taxes, and assembling contingents for the army), while it excludes Jews from all civil employment in the Frankish Kingdom.
- The Palace of Diocletian in Split (Croatia) is damaged by the Avars, who sack the nearby city of Salona. The population flees to the walled palace, which is able to hold out.

==== Britain ====
- Battle of Bampton: King Cynegils of Wessex defeats the invading Britons in Dumnonia (modern Devon). They use the Roman road eastward from Exeter to Dorchester, and are intercepted by the West Saxons marching south.

=== By topic ===
==== Religion ====
- The Sudarium of Oviedo is taken from Palestine, after the invasion of the Sassanid Persians.

==== Other ====
- First year that didn't happen, according to the phantom time hypothesis.

== Births ==
- Eanswith, Anglo-Saxon princess (approximate date)
- Fujiwara no Kamatari, founder of the Fujiwara clan (d. 669)
- Hilda of Whitby, abbess and saint (approximate date)
- Li Yifu, chancellor of the Tang dynasty (d. 666)
- Rictrude, Frankish abbess (approximate date)
- General Xue Rengui of the Tang dynasty (d. 683)

== Deaths ==
- January 13 – Mungo, Brythonic apostle and saint
- Philippicus, Byzantine general (approximate date)
- Queen Sado
