= Sigeheard of Essex =

Sigeheard was joint king of Essex along with his brother, Swaefred, from 694 to 709, succeeding their father Sæbbi.

In 705, they became estranged from King Ine of Wessex for sheltering his rivals to the throne. At the Synod of Brentford, they agreed to banish the rivals from Essex in return for King Ine promising not to attack Essex. The exact chronology of the later years of their rule are uncertain. It is not known whether they governed together until 709 or if Swaefred died before then.

Sigeheard along with Cenred of Mercia confirmed the purchase of Fulham from Tyrhtel (Thyrtell), Bishop of Hereford by Waldhere (Waldherus), Bishop of London (charter S1785).

Preceded by Sæbbi	King of Essex; 694–709 ruled jointly with Swaefred	Succeeded by Offa
