= Sigeberht the Good =

King of Essex

Sigeberht II, nicknamed the Good (Bonus) or the Blessed (Sanctus), was King of the East Saxons (r. c. 653 to ? 660 x 661), in succession to his relative Sigeberht I the Little. Although a bishopric in Essex had been created under Mellitus, the kingdom had returned to paganism and it was in Sigeberht's reign that a systematic (re-)conversion of the East Saxons took root. Bede's Historia Ecclesiastica, Book III, chapter 22, is the main source on his life.

== Family ==
Apart from referring to the odd kinsman, Bede offers little that is of help in determining Sigeberht's family connections. Additional evidence is provided by genealogies for Offa, Swithred and Sigered in a 9th-century West-Saxon manuscript and in two post-Conquest sources: William of Malmesbury's Gesta regum and John of Worcester's Chronicon ex Chronicis, the latter including a memorandum (Chronicon A) and a genealogical list (Chronicon B). Their testimony is at times confused and contradictory. In a comparative analysis of the material, Barbara Yorke suggests that Sigeberht may perhaps have been the son of Sæward and father of Sigehere.

== Power and conversion ==
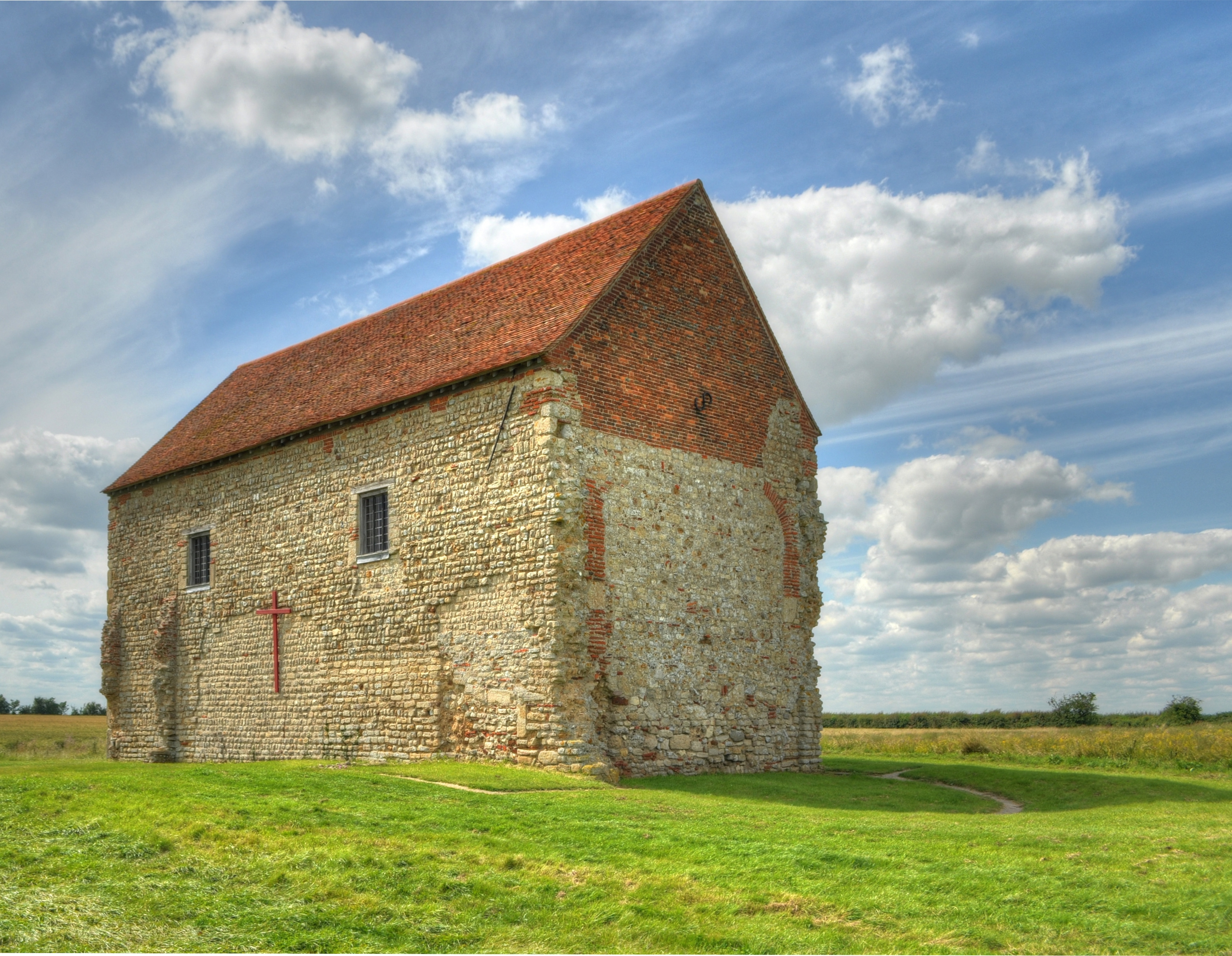
Chapel of St Peter-on-the-Wall, Bradwell-on-the-Sea

Sigeberht found a powerful northern "friend" (amicus) and ally in King Oswiu of Bernicia (r. 642–670). Bede's statement that Sigeberht regularly visited the Bernician court and the general nature of Oswiu's influence on the course of Sigeberht's career suggest that the balance of power was in Oswiu's favour. Oswiu may have intended the alliance to help him offer effective resistance against King Penda of Mercia, as is also suggested by his alliance with Penda's son Peada, king of the Middle Angles.

Bede's portrayal of the king owes much to his interest in the conversion of the East Saxons. A pagan on his accession, Sigeberht was urged by Oswiu to renounce his beliefs and accept Christianity. Like Peada, he and his followers were baptised by Bishop Finan at one of Oswiu's estates called Ad Murum (presumably in the region of Hadrian's Wall, possibly Walbottle), 12 miles from the east coast. The ceremony may have taken place in 653 or 654, before Penda's attack.

On Sigeberht's request, Oswiu dispatched missionaries to evangelise the East Saxons. The party was led by Cedd, freshly recalled from his missionary work among the Middle Angles, and three companion priests. Their efforts were thought to have been so fruitful that when Cedd visited Finan in Lindisfarne, he was consecrated Bishop of Essex. Cedd went on to found communities at Tilaburg (probably East Tilbury) and Ithancester (almost certainly Bradwell-on-Sea). These activities brought about an extension of the authority of the church of Lindisfarne into the south, which has been regarded as "redolent of an opportunistic Bernician colonisation of the region".

== Murder ==
Bede relates how Sigeberht had become a pious king practising Christian forgiveness, but was soon murdered for his new attitude. The perpetrators were his own kinsmen (propinqui), two unnamed brothers who were angry with the king "because he was too ready to pardon his enemies". Bishop Cedd had excommunicated one of the brothers for being unlawfully married and forbade anyone to dine with him or enter his house. Disregarding the bishop's words, however, Sigeberht accepted an invitation from the brothers to enjoy hospitality at their house. When he happened to meet Cedd on the road, he prostrated before him and asked forgiveness, but Cedd prophesied that the king would die in the house for his disobedience. Bede's concluding verdict is that "the death of this religious king was such that it not only atoned for his offence but even increased his merit; for it came about as a result of his piety and his observance of Christ's command."

Whatever the moral message Bede may have intended to convey, the political circumstances suggest a somewhat different scenario. With Oswiu's expulsion, the Bernician grip on East Saxon affairs seems to have slipped away and so when Sigeberht's successor, Swithhelm, son of Seaxbald, needed a candidate to stand sponsor at his baptism, he turned to the king of the East Anglians. A change of loyalty or political affiliations among the East Saxon ruling elite may therefore help explain the context for Sigeberht's assassination. Barbara Yorke even raises the possibility that Swithhelm was in some way accessory to the murder and that he and his brother Swithfrith were the two brothers portrayed by Bede.

The date of Sigeberht's death is unknown, though at the very least, it must have occurred sometime before 664, by which time Swithhelm was dead.

Preceded by Sigeberht I the Little	King of Essex; 653–660	Succeeded by Swithelm
