= Swithhelm of Essex =

King of Essex (d. 664)

Swithhelm was king of Essex from 660 to 664.

Swithhelm succeeded King Sigeberht II after he, along with his brother Swithfrith, murdered him. They accused him of being too friendly towards Christians. In 662, however, he was persuaded to convert to Christianity by Aethelwald, king of East Anglia. After his death in 664, he was succeeded by his cousins Sighere and Sebbi.

Preceded by Sigeberht II the Good	King of Essex; 660–664	Succeeded by Sighere and Sebbi
