= Kingdom of Essex =

Former English kingdom on Great Britain (527–825 CE)

Kingdom of the East Saxons Old English: Ēastseaxna rīce Latin: Regnum Orientalium Saxonum
- 527–825
- Status: Independent kingdom (527–709); Client state of Mercia (709–825)
- Official languages: Old English; Latin
- Religion: Anglo-Saxon paganism (before 7th century); Chalcedonian Christianity (after 7th century)
- Government: Monarchy
- King
  - 527–587: Æscwine (first)
  - 798–825: Sigered (last)
- Legislature: Witenagemot
- Historical era: Heptarchy
  - Established: 527
  - Full integration into the kingdom of Wessex: 825
- Currency: Sceat
Preceded by	Succeeded by
Sub-Roman Britain	Wessex

The Kingdom of the East Saxons, (Note: Old English: Ēastseaxna rīce; Latin: Regnum Orientalium Saxonum) referred to as the Kingdom of Essex (/ˈɛsɪks/), was an early medieval English kingdom, constituting one of the seven traditional kingdoms of the Anglo-Saxon period. (Note: The Latin name was used, for instance, by William of Malmesbury.) It was founded in the 6th century and covered the territory later occupied by the counties of Essex, Middlesex, much of Hertfordshire and (for a short while) west Kent. The last king of Essex was Sigered of Essex, who in 825 ceded the kingdom to Ecgberht, King of Wessex.

== Extent ==
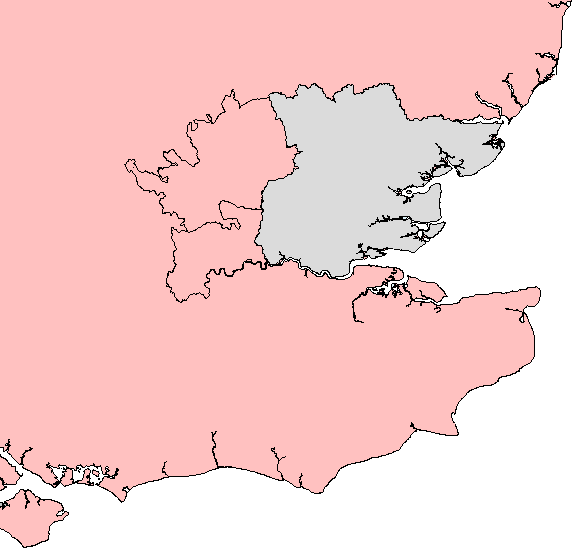
A map showing the outline of those parts now adjacent to the traditional county of Essex (in grey), but which historians postulate were part of the ancient Kingdom of Essex before becoming detached during the middle of the 8th century.

The Kingdom of Essex was bounded to the north by the River Stour and the Kingdom of East Anglia, to the south by the River Thames and Kent, to the east lay the North Sea and to the west Mercia. The territory included the remains of two provincial Roman capitals, Colchester and London.

The kingdom included the Middle Saxon Province, which included the area of the later County of Middlesex and most, if not all, of Hertfordshire Although the province is ever recorded only as part of the East Saxon Kingdom, charter evidence shows that it was not part of its core territory. In the core area, it granted charters freely, but further west, it did so while making reference to its Mercian overlords. At times, Essex was ruled jointly by co-Kings, and it thought that the Middle Saxon Province is likely to have been the domain of one of the co-kings. The links to Essex between Middlesex and parts of Hertfordshire were long reflected in the Diocese of London, re-established in 604 as the East Saxon see, and its boundaries continued to be based on the Kingdom of Essex until the nineteenth century.

The East Saxons also had intermittent control of Surrey. For a brief period in the 8th century, the Kingdom of Essex controlled west Kent.

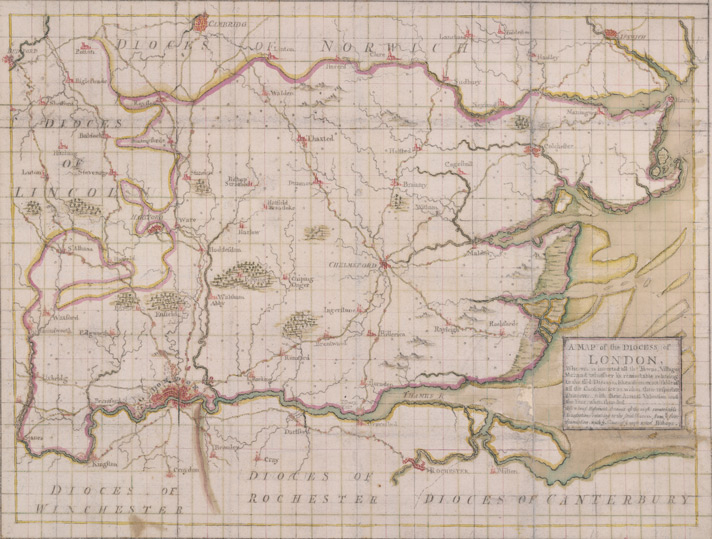
The Diocese of London in 1714. The diocese had its roots in the East Saxon kingdom and was probably originally larger than shown here.

The modern English county of Essex maintains the historic northern and the southern borders but covers only the territory east of the River Lea, the other parts being lost to neighbouring Mercia during the 8th century.

In the Tribal Hidage it is listed as containing 7,000 hides.

== History ==
Although the kingdom of Essex was one of the kingdoms of the Heptarchy, its history is not well documented. It produced relatively few Anglo-Saxon charters and no version of the Anglo-Saxon Chronicle; in fact, the only mention in the chronicle concerns Bishop Mellitus. As a result, the kingdom is regarded as comparatively obscure. For most of the kingdom's existence, the Essex king was subservient to an overlord – variously the kings of Kent, East Anglia or Mercia.

=== Settlement ===
Saxon occupation of land that was to form the kingdom had begun by the early 5th century at Mucking and other locations. A large proportion of the original settlers came from Old Saxony. According to British legend (see Historia Brittonum) the territory known later as Essex was ceded by the Celtic Britons to the Saxons following the infamous Treason of the Long Knives, which occurred c. 460 during the reign of High King Vortigern. Della Hooke relates the territory ruled by the kings of Essex to the pre-Roman territory of the Trinovantes. There is an academic debate about the traditional narrative, with some scholars suggesting a pattern of typically peaceful co-existence, with the structure of the Romano-British landscape being maintained, and with the Saxon settlers believed to have been in the minority. However Alexander Mirrington argues that the cultural change seen in the archaeological record is so complete that "a migration of a large number of people is the most logical and least extreme solution".

== Subkingdoms ==
The kingdom of Essex grew by the absorption of smaller subkingdoms or Saxon tribal groups. There are a number of suggestions for the location of these subkingdoms including:

- The Rodings ("the people of Hrōþa"),
- the Hæmele, Hemel Hempstead
- Vange – "marsh district" (possibly stretching to the Mardyke)
- Denge
- Ginges
- Berecingas – Barking, in the south-west of the kingdom
- Hæferingas in the London Borough of Havering
- Uppingas – Epping

=== Essex monarchy ===
Essex emerged as a single kingdom during the 6th century. The dates, names and achievements of the Essex kings, like those of most early rulers in the Heptarchy, remain conjectural. The historical identification of the kings of Essex, including the evidence and a reconstructed genealogy are discussed extensively by Yorke. The dynasty claimed descent from Woden via Seaxnēat. A genealogy of the Essex royal house was prepared in Wessex in the 9th century. Unfortunately, the surviving copy is somewhat mutilated. At times during the history of the kingdom several sub-kings within Essex appear to have been able to rule simultaneously. They may have exercised authority over different parts of the kingdom. The first recorded king, according to the East Saxon King List, was Æscwine, to which a date of 527 is given for the start of his reign, although there are some difficulties with the date of his reign, and Sledd is listed as the founder of the Essex royal house by other sources. The kings of Essex are notable for their S-nomenclature, nearly all their names begin with the letter S.

The Essex kings issued coins that echoed those issued by Cunobeline simultaneously asserting a link to the first century rulers while emphasising independence from Mercia.

=== Christianity ===
Christianity is thought to have flourished among the Trinovantes in the 4th century AD (late Roman period); indications include the remains of a probable church at Colchester, dating from some time after 320, shortly after the emperor Constantine the Great granted freedom of worship to Christians in 313. Other archaeological evidence includes a chi rho symbol etched on a tile at a site in Wickford, and a gold ring inscribed with a chi rho monogram found at Brentwood. It is not clear to what extent, if any, Christianity persisted by the time of the pagan East Saxon kings in the sixth century.

The earliest English record of the kingdom dates to Bede's Historia ecclesiastica gentis Anglorum, which noted the arrival of Bishop (later Saint) Mellitus in London in 604. Æthelberht (King of Kent and overlord of southern England according to Bede) was in a position to exercise some authority in Essex shortly after 604, when his intervention helped in the conversion of King Sæberht of Essex (son of Sledd), his nephew, to Christianity. It was Æthelberht, and not Sæberht, who built and endowed St. Paul's in London, where St. Paul's Cathedral now stands. Bede describes Æthelberht as Sæberht's overlord. After the death of Sæberht in 616, Mellitus was driven out and the kingdom reverted to paganism. This may have been the result of opposition to Kentish influence in Essex affairs rather than being specifically anti-Christian.

The kingdom reconverted to Christianity under Sigeberht II the Good following a mission by St Cedd who established monasteries at Tilaburg (probably East Tilbury, but possibly West Tilbury) and Ithancester (almost certainly Bradwell-on-Sea). A royal tomb at Prittlewell was discovered and excavated in 2003. Finds included gold foil crosses, suggesting the occupant was Christian. If the occupant was a king, it was probably either Sæberht or Sigeberht (murdered 653). It is, however, also possible that the occupant was not royal, but simply a wealthy and powerful individual whose identity has gone unrecorded.

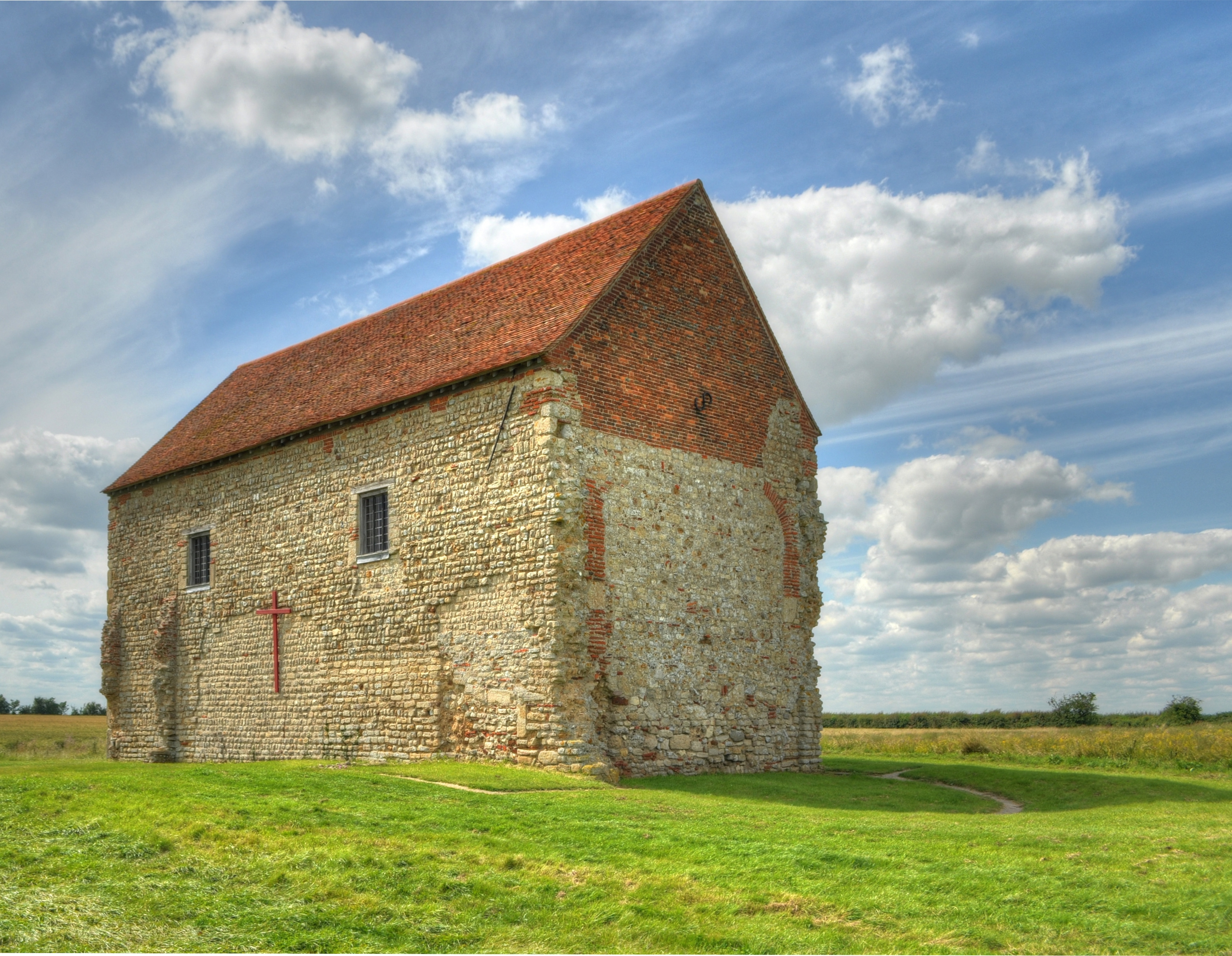
St Peter's Chapel, Bradwell-on-Sea. Established by St Cedd, the patron saint of Essex around 662, it was built on the site of the abandoned Roman Saxon Shore fort of Othona.

Essex reverted to Paganism again in 660 with the ascension of the pagan King Swiþhelm. He converted in 662, but died in 664. He was succeeded by his two sons: Sigehere and Sæbbi. A plague the same year caused Sigehere and his people to recant their Christianity and Essex reverted to Paganism a third time. This rebellion was suppressed by Wulfhere of Mercia who established himself as overlord. Bede describes Sigehere and Sæbbi as "rulers […] under Wulfhere, king of the Mercians". Wulfhere sent Jaruman, the bishop of Lichfield, to reconvert the East Saxons.

Wine (in 666) and Erkenwald (in 675) were appointed bishops of London with spiritual authority over the East Saxon Kingdom. A small stone chest bearing the name of Sæbbi of Essex (r. 664–683) was visible in Old St Paul's Cathedral until the Great Fire of London of 1666 when the cathedral and the tombs within it were lost. The inscription on the chest was recorded by Paul Hentzner and translated by Robert Naunton as reading: "Here lies Seba, King of the East Saxons, who was converted to the faith by St. Erkenwald, Bishop of London, A.D. 677".

Although London, like the rest of Middlesex, was lost by the East Saxons in the 8th century, the bishops of London continued to exert spiritual authority over Essex as a kingdom, shire and county until 1845.

=== Later history and end ===
Despite the comparative obscurity of the kingdom, there were strong connections between Essex and the Kentish kingdom across the river Thames that led to the marriage of King Sledd to Ricula, sister of the king, Æthelberht of Kent. For a brief period in the 8th century the kingdom included west Kent. During this period, Essex kings issued their own sceattas (coins), perhaps as an assertion of their own independence. However, by the mid-8th century, much of the kingdom, including London, had fallen to Mercia, and the rump of Essex, roughly the modern county, had become subordinate to the same. After the defeat of the Mercian king Beornwulf around 825, Sigered, the last king of Essex, ceded the kingdom, which then became a possession of the Wessex king Egbert.

The Mercians continued to control parts of Essex and may have supported a pretender to the Essex throne since a Sigeric rex Orientalem Saxonum witnessed a Mercian charter after 825. During the 9th century, Essex was part of a sub-kingdom that included Sussex, Surrey and Kent. Sometime between 878 and 886, the territory was formally ceded by Wessex to the Danelaw kingdom of East Anglia, under the Treaty of Alfred and Guthrum. After the reconquest by Edward the Elder, the king's representative in Essex was styled an ealdorman, and Essex came to be regarded as a shire.

== List of kings ==
The following list of kings may omit whole generations.

Reign	Incumbent	Notes
527 to 587	(perhaps) Æscwine or Erchenwine	First king according to some sources, others saying son Sledd was first
587 to ante 604	Sledd	Son of Æscwine/Ercenwine
ante 604 to 616/7?	Sæberht	Son of Sledd
616/7? to 623?	Sexred	Son of Sæberht. Joint king with Sæward and a third brother; killed in battle against the West Saxons
616/7? to 623?	Sæward	Son of Sæberht. Joint king with Sexred and a third brother; killed in battle against the West Saxons
616/7? to 623?	(another son of Sæberht, name unknown)	Joint king with Sexred and Sæward; killed in battle against the West Saxons
623? to ante c. 653	Sigeberht the Little	
c. 653 to 660	Sigeberht the Good	Apparently son of Sæward. Saint Sigeberht; Saint Sebbi (Feast Day 29 August)
660 to 664	Swiþhelm	
664 to 683	Sighere	son of a Sigeberht, probably 'the Good'. Joint-king with Sæbbi
664 to c. 694	Sæbbi	Son of Sexred. Joint-king with Sighere; abdicated in favour of his son Sigeheard
c. 694 to c. 709	Sigeheard	Joint-king with his brother Swæfred
c. 695 to c. 709	Swæfred	Son of Sæbbi. Joint-king with his brother Sigeheard
c. 709	Offa	Son of Sighere. Joint-king during latter part of reign of Swæfred and perhaps Sigeheard.
c. 709? to 746	Sælred	Representing distant line descended from Sledd. Probably joint-king with Swæfbert
c. 715 to 738	Swæfbert	Probably joint-king with Sælred
746 to 758	Swiþred	Grandson of Sigeheard
758 to 798	Sigeric	Son of Saelred. Abdicated
798 to 812	Sigered	Son of Sigeric. Mercia defeated by Egbert of Wessex, sub-kingdom of Essex subsumed into Wessex; from 812 to about 825 held it only as dux.

== Bibliography ==
- Carpenter, Clive. Kings, Rulers and Statesmen. Guinness Superlatives, Ltd.
- Ross, Martha. Rulers and Governments of the World, Vol. 1. Earliest Times to 1491.
