= Sæbbi of Essex =

King of Essex (d. 695)

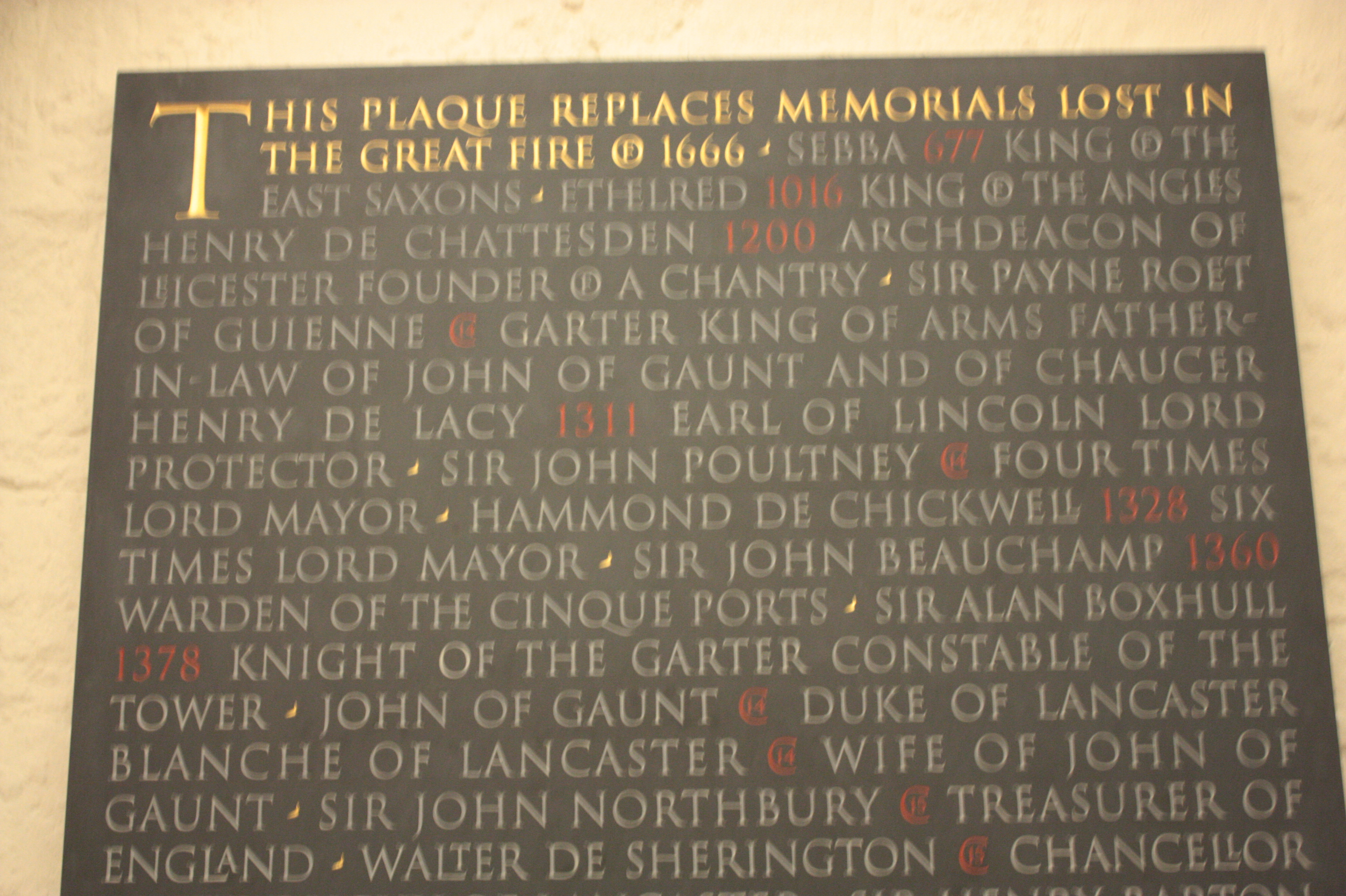
- Sebba's name listed among the early graves lost noted on the memorial in St Paul's Cathedral

King of Essex until 683 with Sighere
- Reign: 664–694
- Predecessor: Swithelm
- Successor: Sigeheard and Swæfred
- Born: before c. 626; Kingdom of Essex
- Died: 695; Kingdom of Essex
- Burial: Old St Paul's Cathedral, City of London (Tomb destroyed in the Great Fire of London)
- Spouse: Name unknown
- Issue: Swæfheard of Kent; Sigeheard of Essex; Swæfred of Essex
- Father: Sexred
- Religion: Christianity, prev. Anglo-Saxon paganism

Sæbbi (also known as Saint Sebbi or Sebba; before 626 – 695) was son of Sexred and was the joint King of Essex from 664 to about 683 along with his cousin, Sighere. After Sighere died, Sæbbi became sole ruler of Essex until 694.

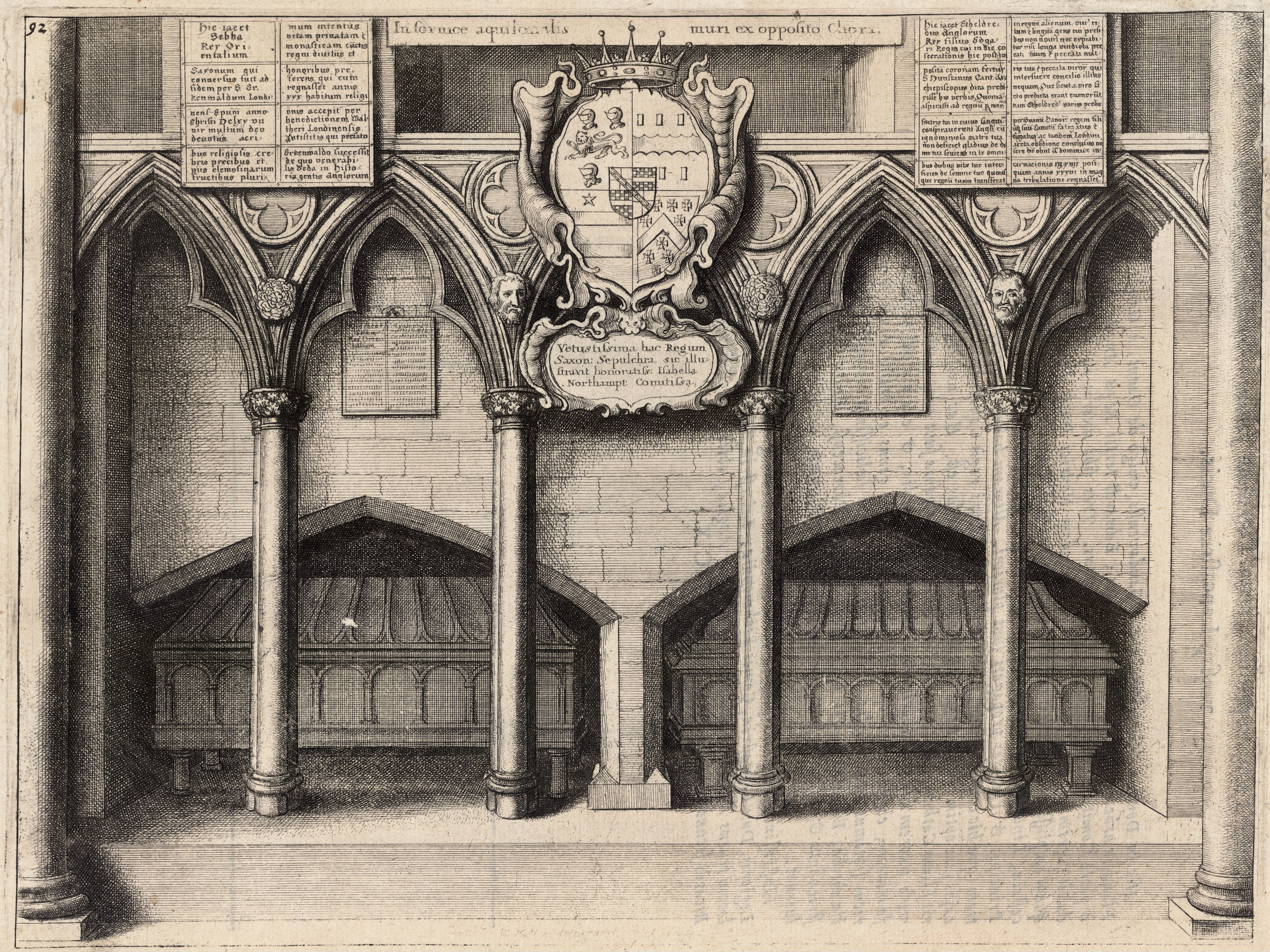
Drawing of tombs of Kings Sæbbi and Æthelred the Unready in Old St Paul's Cathedral by Wenceslaus Hollar

== Life ==
Sighere and Sæbbi were cousins of their predecessor, Swithelm. In 665 Sighere apostatized and fell back into paganism, while Sebbi remained a faithful Christian. They soon developed a rivalry. Sighere found an ally in Wessex, and Sæbbi in Mercia. As a result of their rivalry, King Wulfhere of Mercia established himself as overlord of Essex in 665. He despatched Jaruman, the Bishop of Mercia, who was assigned to reconvert the people of Essex to Christianity.

In 686, Cædwalla, a Wessex sub-king, established himself as overlord of Essex. He and Sæbbi invaded Kent, expelling King Eadric, and Sæbbi ruled over West Kent. It was presumably at the time that Sæbbi founded the original abbey at Westminster.

Sæbbi is believed to have abdicated in 694 in order to enter a monastery, and was succeeded by his sons, Sigeheard and Swaefred, who ruled jointly over Essex. Another son, Swæfheard, would rule the Kingdom of Kent. Sæbbi died in 695 and was buried in Old St Paul's Cathedral in the City of London where he was revered as a saint. He is commemorated by Orthodox Church on Aug. 29 and in the Roman Martyrology also in the same day. Bede recounts the burial thus (4.11):

AT that time, as the same little book informs us, Sebbi, a devout man, of whom mention has been made above, governed the kingdom of the East Saxons. He was much addicted to religious actions, almsgiving, and frequent prayer; preferring a private and monastic life to all the wealth and honours of his kingdom, which sort of life he would also long before have undertaken, had not his wife positively refused to be divorced from him; for which reason many were of opinion, and often said so, that a person of such a disposition ought rather to have been a bishop than a king. When he had been thirty years a king, and a soldier of the heavenly kingdom, he fell into a violent sickness, of which he died, and admonished his wife, that they should then at least jointly devote themselves to the service of God, since they could no longer enjoy, or rather serve, the world. Having with much difficulty obtained this of her, he repaired to Waldhere, bishop of London, who had succeeded Earconwald, and With his blessing received the religious habit, which he had long desired. He also carried to him a considerable sum of money, to be given to the poor, reserving nothing to himself, but rather coveting to remain poor in spirit for the sake of the kingdom of heaven

When the aforesaid distemper increased upon him, and he perceived the day of his death to be drawing near, being a man of a royal disposition, he began to apprehend lest, when under pain, and at the approach of death, he might be guilty of anything unworthy of his person, either in words, or any motion of his limbs. Wherefore, calling to him the aforesaid bishop of London, in which city he then was, he entreated him that none might be present at his death, besides the bishop himself, and two of his attendants. The bishop having promised that he would most willingly perform the same, not long after the man of God composed himself to sleep, and saw a comforting vision, which took from him all anxiety for the aforesaid uneasiness; and, moreover, showed him on what day he was to depart this life. For, as he afterwards related, he saw three men in bright garments come to him; one of whom sat down before his bed, whilst his companions stood and inquired about the state of the sick man they came to see: he who was sitting in front of the bed said, that his soul should depart his body without any pain, and with a great splendour of light; and declared that he should die the third day after; both which particulars happened, as he had been informed by the vision; for on the third day after, he suddenly fell, as it were, into a slumber, and breathed out his soul without any sense or pain.

A stone coffin having been provided for burying his body, when they came to lay it in the same, they found his body a span longer than the coffin. Hereupon they hewed away the stone, and made the coffin about two fingers longer; but neither would it then contain the body. Under this difficulty of entombing him, they had thoughts either to get another coffin, or else to shorten the body, by bending it at the knees, if they could. But a wonderful event, caused by Providence, prevented the execution of either of those designs for on a sudden, in the presence of the bishop, and Sighard, the son of the king who had turned monk, and who reigned after him jointly with his brother Suefred, and of a considerable number of men, that same coffin was found to answer the length of the body, insomuch that a pillow might also be put in at the head; and at the feet the coffin was four fingers longer than the body. He was buried in the church of the blessed Apostle of the Gentiles, by whose instructions he had learned to hope for heavenly things.

Sæbbi's tomb survived the 1087 fire at St Paul's and his remains were transferred to a black marble sarcophagus in the mid 12th century. This sarcophagus was recorded in a series of drawings by Wenceslaus Hollar, published in Dugdale's History of St Paul's. The tomb was destroyed in the Great Fire of London. A plaque to Sæbbi was erected in the Wren cathedral.

== Notes ==
Preceded by Swithelm	King of Essex; 664–694 ruled jointly with Sighere from 664 to 683	Succeeded by Sigeheard and Swaefred
