= Sighere of Essex =

King of Essex jointly with Sæbbi
- Reign: 663/4 – ca. 688
- Predecessor: Swithhelm
- Successor: Sæbbi
- Spouse: Osgyth
- Issue: Offa of Essex
- Religion: Anglo-Saxon polytheism

Sighere was the joint king of the Kingdom of Essex along with his cousin Sæbbi from 663 or 664 until about 688. He was son of Sigeberht Sæwarding, probably Saint Sigeberht, but perhaps Sigeberht the Little. He was outlived by Sæbbi, who became the sole ruler of Essex after his death. Sighere and Sæbbi were cousins of their predecessor Swithelm. While Sighere returned to paganism, Sæbbi remained Christian. They soon developed a rivalry. Sighere found an ally in Wessex, and Sæbbi with Mercia. As a result of their rivalry, King Wulfhere of Mercia established himself as overlord of Essex, and induced Sighere to marry Wulfhere's niece Osgyth, daughter of Frithuwold, sub-king of Mercia in Surrey. Jaruman, the bishop of Mercia, was assigned to reconvert the people of Essex to Christianity. In 673, Sighere separated from Osgyth, who then fled to the protection of Bishop Beaduwine of North Elmham. Sighere died about 688, and Sæbbi became sole ruler of Essex.

| Preceded by Swithhelm | King of Essex; 664–683 ruled jointly with Sæbbi | Succeeded by Sæbbi |
