= Christianisation of Anglo-Saxon England =

Conversion of population to Christianity

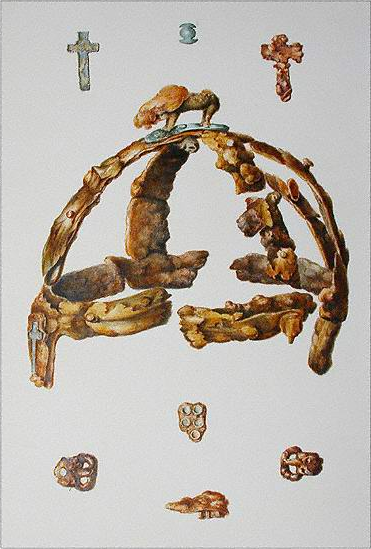
The Benty Grange helm, as depicted in a watercolour by Llewellynn Jewitt, which features both Christian crosses and a boar crest, typically found in heathen contexts

Starting in the late 6th century, Anglo-Saxons converted from Anglo-Saxon and Norse paganism to Christianity. The process and timing of their Christianisation varied by region and was not necessarily a one-way process, with the traditional religion regaining dominance in most kingdoms of modern-day England at least once after their first Christian king. Kings likely often converted for political reasons such as the imposition by a more powerful king, to gain legitimacy, and to access book-writing traditions; however, there were also significant drawbacks to the conversion that may explain the reluctance of many kings to be baptised.

The first major step was the Gregorian mission that landed in the Kingdom of Kent in 597, and within the Heptarchy, Æthelberht of Kent became the first Anglo-Saxon king to be baptised, around 600. He in turn imposed Christianity on Saebert of Essex and Rædwald of East Anglia. Around 628, Eadwine of Deira was baptised and promoted the new religion in Northumbria, being the kingdom north of the Humber. The expansion of Christianity in Northern England was later aided by the Hiberno-Scottish mission, arriving from the Scottish island of Iona around 634. Mercia adopted Christianity after the death of heathen king Penda in 655. The last Anglo-Saxon king to adhere to the traditional religion was Arwald of Wihtwara, who was killed in battle in 686, at which point Sussex and Wessex had already adopted Christianity.

During the Viking Age, circa 800–1050, settlers from Scandinavia reintroduced paganism to eastern and northern England. Though evidence is limited, it seems that they broadly converted to Christianity within generations, with the last potentially pagan king being Eric Haraldsson Bloodaxe, who ruled in York until 954, when he was driven out by king Eadred of the English.

Practices perceived as heathen continued in England after the conversion of kings, with the first record of them being made illegal taking place under the rule of Eorcenberht of Kent around 640. Laws forbidding these practices continued into the 11th century, with punishments ranging from fines to fasting and execution.

Other practices and ideas blended with the incoming Christian culture to create mixed practices, for example the use of Christian saints to combat harmful beings such as dwarfs or elves, and the use of Germanic words to refer to Christian concepts such as "God", "Heaven" and "Hell". Beyond word usage, other Germanic elements also continued to be used and developed into the modern period in folklore, such as in British ballad traditions. Despite this continuity with the pre-Christian culture, Christianity was nonetheless adopted and many prominent missionaries involved in the conversion of Scandinavia and the Frankish Kingdom were English.

== Background ==
=== Christianity in Roman Britain ===
Christianity was present in Roman Britain from at least the 3rd century. In 313, the Edict of Milan legalised Christianity, and it quickly became the major religion in the Roman Empire. The following year the Council of Arles was attended by three bishops from Eboracum (York), Londinium (London) and either Lindum Colonia (Lincoln) or Camulodunum (Colchester). Their presence indicates that by the early 4th century, the British church was organised under an episcopal hierarchy.

In the 4th century, Christianity was still a minority religion, though most common in Southern Britain, Eboracum, and within the vicinity of Hadrian's Wall. There is further evidence for hostility towards Christianity, with some baptismal fonts having been found intentionally damaged and destroyed, and a significant decline in Christianity is suggested to have taken place as a result of the Great Conspiracy of 367–369. Furthermore, there is evidence for the Romano-Celtic religion remaining strong in the late 4th century despite Christianity increasingly being adopted during this time in western Roman provinces such as Gaul, where Martin of Tours led violent destructions of pagan holy sites. Christianity nonetheless survived in Britain during the 5th century.

British missionaries, most famously Saint Patrick, converted Ireland to Christianity. The early British and Irish churches shared common characteristics often described as Celtic Christianity.

=== Anglo-Saxon migrations, c. 430–570 ===
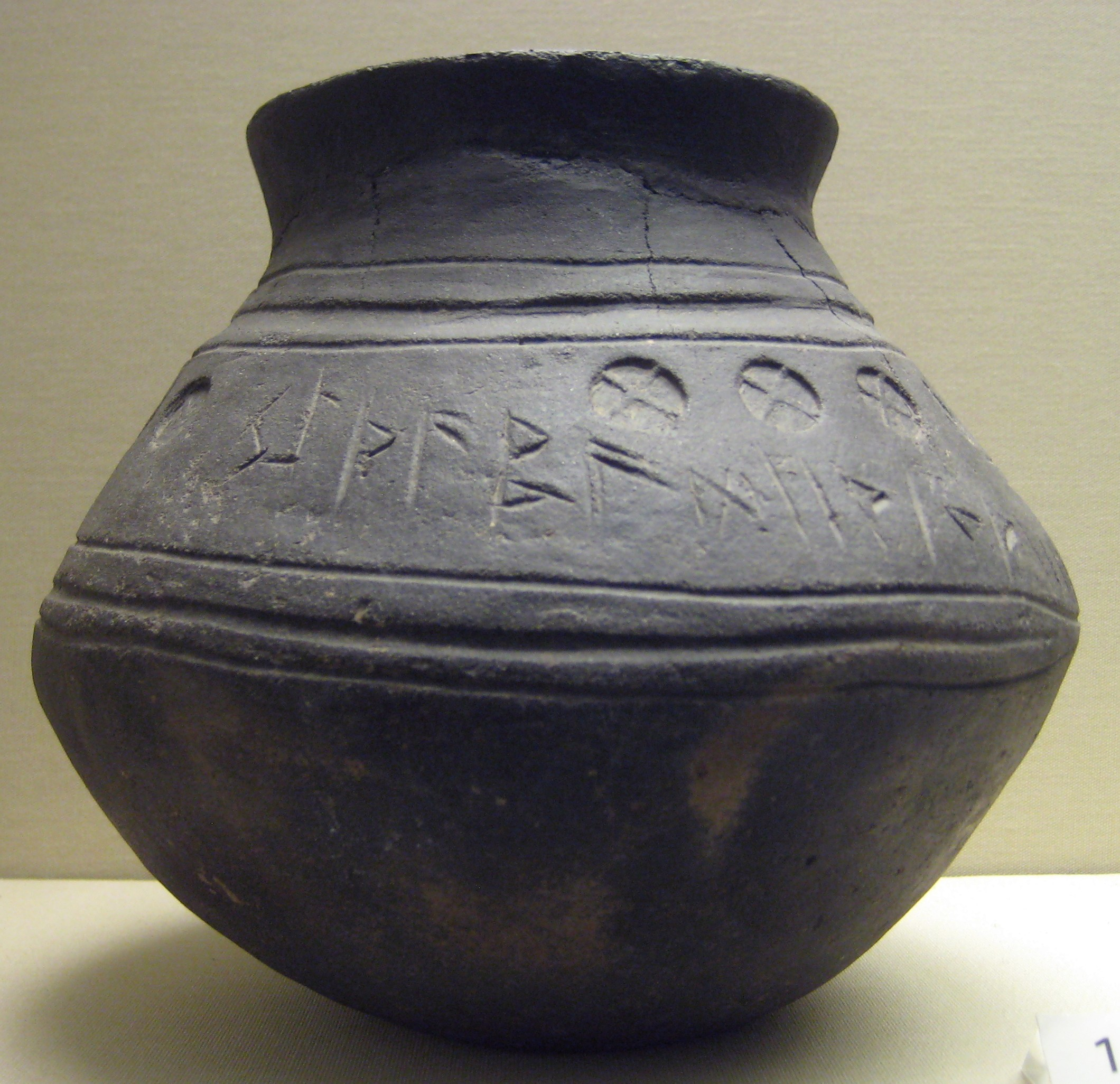
An Anglo-Saxon urn, used for cremation burials that closely resemble those in southern Scandinavia and what is now northern Germany.

During the period from the end of Roman rule around 430 to 570, dramatic cultural changes occurred in southern and eastern Britain as a result of the Anglo-Saxon migrations. Old English replaced Latin and Brittonic languages, and Anglo-Saxon forms of Germanic paganism became dominant. This was a polytheistic religion, with gods worshipped including Woden, Thunor, and Tiw.

Based on older sources such as Vita Germani and De Excidio et Conquestu Britanniae, the 8th-century historian Bede wrote that no organised church survived in the areas under Anglo-Saxon control, with no bishoprics or churches that were not in ruins. Despite this, Bede also believed that the cult of St Alban was continuously active from the Roman period until his time of writing. It has been suggested that writers may have downplayed the role of British communities in the origins of English church sites and that Christian communities may have remained relatively strong in the west and north of Britain, and possibly in small pockets in the east and south. This may be attested in the placename Eccles, derived from the word for church in Common Brittonic (eglwys) and Latin (ecclesia), and in archaeological finds in Lincoln.

== Nature of conversion and Christianisation ==
Paganism and Christianity are often portrayed as distinct and in opposition by Church officials such as Bede, Ælfric and Wulfstan, with conversion corresponding in a dramatic shift from one to the other. In practice, while this may have been true in the sphere of formal religion, this is only a small part of the wider popular religion where they blended together. It has been proposed that in cases where there is continuity between traditional Germanic religion and practices attested after conversion, this should be seen as the retention of Germanic folklore in Christianity rather than the continuation of paganism as a religious system. It has also been argued that Anglo-Saxon and Nordic paganism are better conceived of as groupings of religious systems or paganisms with shared characteristics rather than individual religions and that they were inseparable from other aspects of life in the cultures of those that practised them.

Furthermore, it has been argued that paganism and Christianity were not two alternative versions of the same social phenomenon and that heathens and Christians likely would have had different conceptions of what religion was. Because of this, the traditional religions could not be replaced by Christianity in a one-for-one swap. Converts could for this reason potentially not see actions for which they were criticised as conflicting with their new religion. Similarly, one person could worship both the traditional gods and the Christian god, or different gods be worshipped by different people within one household, possibly explaining the cases of unbaptised children of convert kings described by Bede.

The terms "conversion" and "Christianisation" are sometimes used interchangeably to refer to the adoption of Christianity; however, Lesley Abrams proposed that it is useful to use "conversion" to refer to the first transition, marked by a formal acceptance of Christianity such as baptism, and "Christianisation" to refer to the penetration of Christian beliefs and practices into the converted society, with the latter process being much more difficult to measure. She further suggests conversion possibly being about leaders and Christianisation being about those they lead.

== Kent, c. 597–624 ==
=== Late 6th century: Æthelbert of Kent marries Bertha ===
In 595, when Pope Gregory I decided to send a mission to convert the Anglo-Saxons to Christianity, the Kingdom of Kent was ruled by Æthelberht. He had married a Christian princess named Bertha. The exact year of marriage is unclear, with Bede suggesting around 590, while based on dates of her birth inferred from the writings of Gregory of Tours, scholars have suggested alternative dates of 579 or even earlier than 560. Bertha was the daughter of Charibert I, one of the Merovingian kings of the Franks. As one of the conditions of her marriage she was allowed to freely practise Christianity and bring the bishop Liudhard with her to Kent as her chaplain. They restored a church in Canterbury that dated to the time of the Roman occupation, possibly the present-day St Martin's Church. Liudhard does not appear to have made many converts among the Anglo-Saxons, and his mention by Bede is only corroborated by a gold coin bearing an inscription that refers to a bishop by his name. (Note: The inscription reads Leudardus Eps, in which Eps is an abbreviation of Episcopus ("bishop").) It has been suggested that Bertha had a significant role in the later conversion of Æthelberht.

The marriage fits into a wider context of close relations, such as trade, between Kent and the Frankish kingdom which was expanding and establishing overlordship over kingdoms in the North Sea region during the 6th century. It has been suggested this Frankish influence and support was an important factor that led to Kent becoming one of the dominant kingdoms in the late 6th and 7th centuries.

=== c. 597–616: The Gregorian mission and the conversion of Æthelberht ===
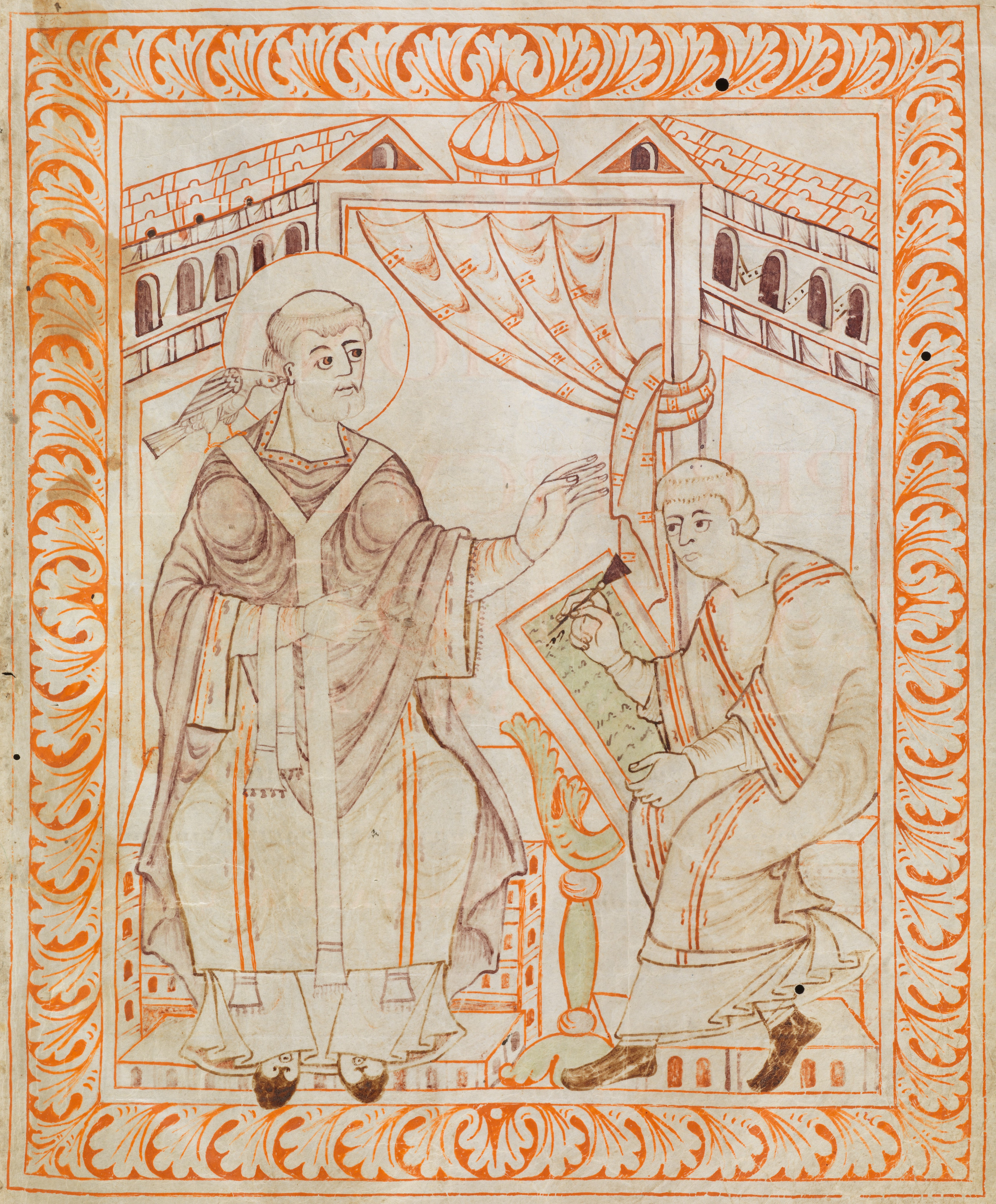
Gregory dictating, from a 10th-century manuscript

Around 150 years after the last recorded appeal from Britons to Roman authorities for help, in 597, the Gregorian mission was launched. It was led by Augustine and included Frankish interpreters and around 40 monks. They landed at Thanet in Kent where they were received by Æthelberht and achieved some initial success. That they were not met by a representative from the British Church has been used as evidence for the absence of Christian presence as a result of the Anglo-Saxon migrations. Æthelberht permitted the missionaries to settle and preach in his capital of Canterbury, where they used the Church of St Martin for services.

Æthelberht converted to Christianity during his life but the date is not recorded in any surviving source. It probably took place around 597, however, with 601 as likely the latest possible date. (Note: Bede's chronology may be slightly off, as he gives the king's death as occurring in February 616, and says the king died 21 years after his conversion, which would date the conversion to 595. This would be before the mission and would mean that either the queen or Liudhard converted Æthelberht, which contradicts Bede's own statement that the king's conversion was due to the Gregorian mission. Since Gregory in his letter of 601 to the king and queen strongly implies that the queen was unable to effect the conversion of her husband, thus providing independent testimony to Æthelberht's conversion by the mission, the problem of the dating is likely a chronological error on Bede's part.) A letter of Gregory's to Patriarch Eulogius of Alexandria in June 598 mentions the number of converts made but does not mention that the king's baptism specifically, suggesting it had not taken place by that time. (Note: Suso Brechter argued that Æthelberht was not converted until after 601, however this is not typically accepted by other scholars.) The baptism location is also not recorded, although it likely took place in Canterbury. It is widely accepted that by 601 Æthelberht had converted as in this year, Gregory wrote to both Æthelberht and Bertha, calling the king his son and possibly referring to his baptism. (Note: The letter says "preserve the grace he had received". Grace in this context has been interpreted as the grace of baptism.) In the letter, Gregory further asks the king to hasten the spread of Christianity through acts such as hunting down idol worship, and heathen temples, along with encouraging good morals by terrifying them and demonstrating good deeds. (Note: Text is as follows: "And so, glorious son, protect that grace which you have received from Heaven with a concerned mind, hasten to extend the Christian faith among the races subject to you, redouble your righteous enthusiasm in their conversion, hunt down the worship of idols, and overturn the building of temples, by encouraging the morality of your subjects with your great purity of life, by terrifying them, by flattering them, by correcting them and by showing them the example of good deeds.") In contrast with this, a letter dated to July 601 from Gregory to Abbot Mellitus orders that whilst idols are still to be destroyed and for the traditional religion (referred to by Gregory as demon worship) to be stamped out, temples are to be sprinkled with blessed water, for altars to be made and for relics to be placed in them. He further encourages reframing of traditional practices such as sacrifices and celebrations in a Christian context, in which festivals are dedicated to martyrs and the slaughtered animals are eaten in praise of God. (Note: Text is as follows: "That the temples (fana) of the idols among that people ought not to be destroyed at all, but the idols themselves, which are inside them, should be destroyed. Let water be blessed and sprinkled in the same temples, and let altars be constructed and relics placed there. For if those temples have been well constructed, it is necessary that they should be changed from the cult of demons to the worship of the true God, so that, while that race sees itself that its temples are not being destroyed, it may remove error from its people's hearts, and by knowing and adoring the true God, they may come together in their customary places in a more friendly manner. And because they are accustomed to killing many oxen (boves) while sacrificing to their demons, some solemn rites should be changed for them over this matter. So on the day of the dedication, or the festivals of the holy martyrs, whose relics are placed there, they should make huts for themselves around those churches that have been converted from shrines, with branches of trees, and they should celebrate the festival with religious feasting. Do not let them sacrifice animals to the devil, but let them slaughter animals for eating in praise of God ... It is doubtless impossible to cut out from their stubborn minds everything at once ... Thus the Lord made himself known to the Israelites in Egypt; yet he preserved in his own worship the forms of sacrifice which they were accustomed to offer to the devil and commanded them to kill animals when sacrificing to him (Leviticus 17: 1–9). He thereby changed their hearts ... yet since the people were offering them to the true God and not to idols, they were not the same sacrifices.")

It is uncertain why Æthelberht chose to convert to Christianity. Bede suggests that the king converted strictly for religious reasons, but most modern historians see other motives behind Æthelberht's decision. Certainly, given Kent's close contacts with Gaul, it is possible that Æthelberht sought baptism in order to smooth his relations with the Merovingian kingdoms, or to align himself with one of the factions then contending in Gaul. Another consideration may have been that new methods of administration often followed conversion, whether directly from the newly introduced church or indirectly from other Christian kingdoms.

Evidence from Bede suggests that although Æthelberht encouraged conversion, he was unable to compel his subjects to become Christians during his reign. The historian R. A. Markus proposes that this was due to the strong heathen presence in Kent which forced the king to rely on indirect means to secure conversions, including royal patronage and friendship, rather than force. For Markus, this is demonstrated by the way in which Bede describes the king's conversion efforts, in which he could not compel them to adopt Christianity, instead being able to only "rejoice at their conversion" and to "hold believers in greater affection". Some time after Æthelberht's conversion, Bertha died and Æthelberht married again to a woman whose name is not recorded, but was likely to have been heathen. (Note: That she was heathen is suggested by her marriage to her stepson Eadbald after Æthelberht's death; a marriage between a stepmother and stepson was forbidden by the church.)

=== c. 616–640: Eadbald's reign ===
==== Heathen reaction upon Æthelberht's death ====
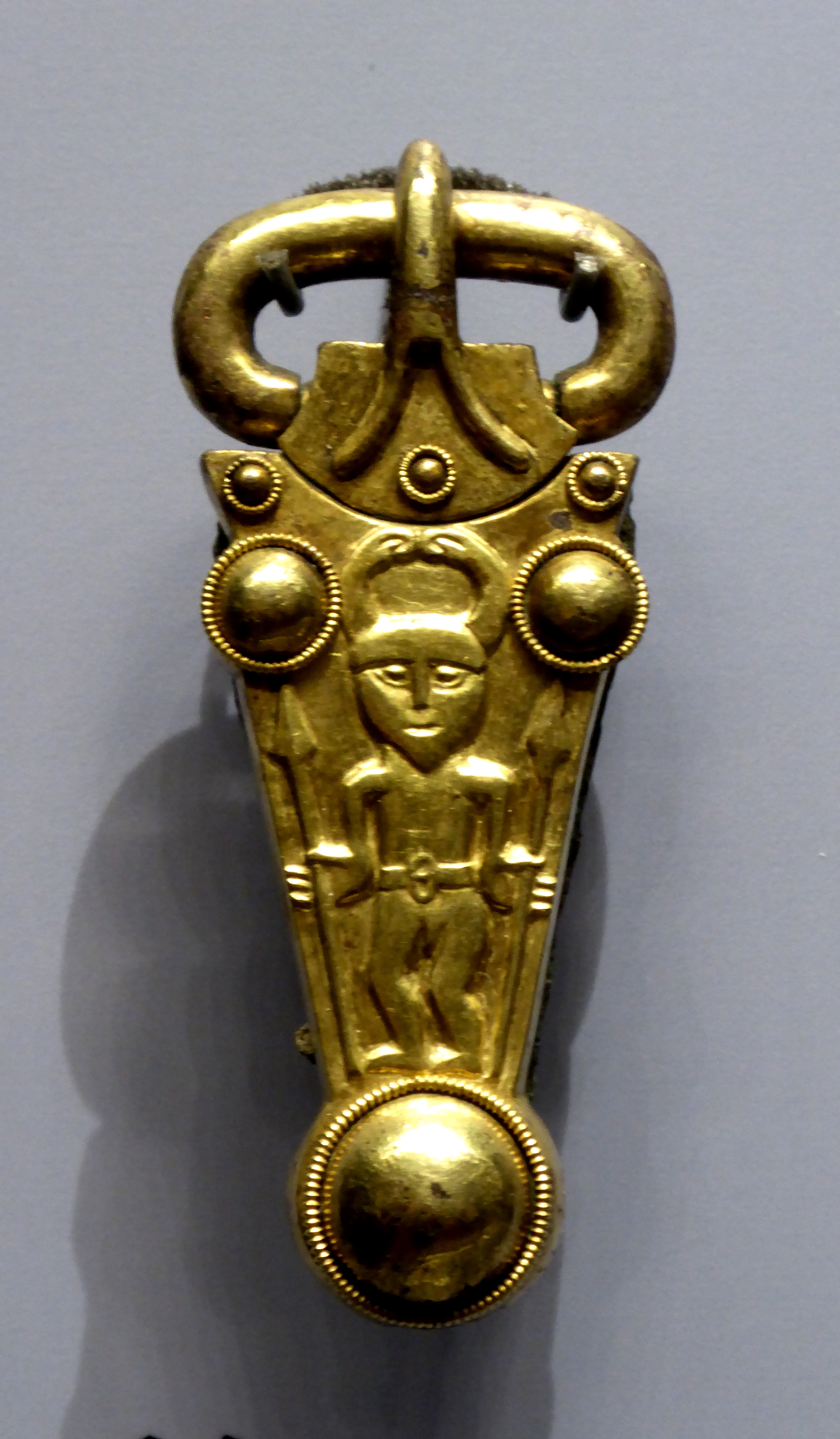
Golden buckle from Finglesham, interpreted as connected to the cult of Wōden and suggested to date to the time of Eadbald's heathen resurgence in the 7th century.

Eadbald became king of Kent on the death of his father on 24 February 616, or possibly 618. Although Æthelberht had been Christian since around 600 and his wife Bertha was also Christian, Eadbald was a pagan and led a strong reaction against the Gregorian mission, refusing to be baptised and marrying his stepmother, Æthelberht's second wife. Such an act was forbidden by Church law but was likely widespread in Anglo-Saxon society at the time and has been proposed to have helped individuals involved by renewing links made by the former marriage, whilst also keeping property within the kinship group.

Around this time, King Sæberht of Essex, who had become a Christian under Æthelberht's influence, died and his sons also led a reaction against Christianity, expelling Mellitus, the bishop of London, who left for Gaul. This rejection of Christianity in both Essex and Kent at the same time was likely a result of coordination by the kings. The Bishop of Rochester Justus also left in this time, leaving Canterbury isolated. Consistent with this, Bede records that Eadbald's repudiation of Christianity was a severe setback to the growth of the Church in England. He further claims that Eadbald was divinely punished for his faithlessness, describing him as suffering from "frequent fits of madness" and being possessed by an "unclean spirit" that Barbara Yorke identified with epilepsy.

The increased support from the elites for the traditional religion may be reflected in grave goods from the Anglo-Saxon cemetery at Finglesham that have been proposed to date to the period of the heathen reaction. These include a gilt buckle and a bronze pendant that both depict a man wearing a horned headdress, the ends of which are birds, that has been connected to the cult of the Germanic god Wōden. If this dating is correct, it would demonstrate the persistence of heathen ideas despite Ætheberht's conversion at the beginning of the 7th century.

==== Eadbald's baptism ====
Bede writes that Laurentius, the archbishop of Canterbury was also considering leaving after the rejection of Christianity in Essex and Kent but was scourged by St Peter, which convinced him to stay. According to these writings the archbishop showed Eadbald the wounds where he'd been beaten the night before and out of fear, Eadbald renounced his endogamous marriage and agreed to be baptised, meaning he would have been converted in 616 or 617. After his conversion, Mellitus and Justus returned from Gaul with the latter returning to Rochester. Eadbald did not have sufficient influence to restore Mellitus to his former church in London, however, against the will of the local heathens and he was unable to force the East Saxon kings to adopt Christianity. Mellitus thus remained in Canterbury where he consecrated a church that Eadbald had had built. Furthermore, Bede writes that in 625 Eadbald's sister Æthelburh, who was a Christian, married Eadwine of Deira and Paulinus accompanied her to minister to the Christian community there.

While an important source on Eadbald's reign, scholars contest some aspects of Bede's account. The account of Laurence's miraculous scourging by Peter, for example, is likely a later hagiographical invention of the monastery of St Augustine's, Canterbury that is not historical. Furthermore, Kirby points out that Boniface's letter to Æthelburh makes it clear that the news of Eadbald's conversion is recent, meaning that Eadbald would have been converted by Justus rather than Laurentius, as is implied by Boniface's letter to Justus sent around 624. Kirby concludes that Eadbald was converted shortly before the sending of Boniface's letters to Ætherburh, Eadwine and Justus, and no later than April 624, when Mellitus died. This alternative timeline extends the duration of the pagan reaction from less than a year, in Bede's narrative, to about eight years, fitting better with the account of a serious crisis for the Church which the Roman mission in south-east England barely survived.

After his baptism, Eadbald married his second wife, Ymme. Whilst her exact ancestry is debated, she was likely the daughter of Frankish elites. Consistent with this, it has been put forward that Francia was critical in supporting the missionaries during this time and that Frankish influences in the court were a central reason why Eadbald agreed to convert, with marriage to Ymme being closely tied to his baptism. Through this, Eadbald possibly sought to restore the relationship with the Franks that had been strengthened during Æthelberht's reign. Consistent with the close ties between the Frankish and Kentish families, Æthelburh later sent her children with Eadwine to Dagobert I out of fear they were in danger.

=== 640 onwards: Solidification of Christianity and repression of heathen practices ===
When Eadbald died in 640, his son Eorcenberht succeeded him and is described by Bede as having ordered that throughout his whole kingdom all "idols" (cult images) be forsaken and destroyed, and Lent be observed, and those who do not obey his commands be punished, making him the first king in England to do so. After this decree, no more apostate, or otherwise heathen, elites in Kent are recorded. He ruled for a further 24 years, during which Ithamar was appointed as bishop of Rochester, becoming the first Anglo-Saxon to be made a bishop. Eorcenberht was succeeded by his son Ecgberht who in 664 was personally involved in the appointment of the successor for Deusdedit, the first English Archbishop of Canterbury.

== Essex, c. 604–665 ==
=== c. 604–650: Baptism of Sæberht and heathen reaction from his sons ===
The first king of Essex to nominally convert to Christianity was Sæberht, who was baptised by Mellitus, one of Augustine's helpers, around 604 under the authority of Æthelberht of Kent who held overlordship over the East Saxons at the time. After this, a bishopric was set up by Mellitus in London which was part of the East Saxon kingdom at the time. It has been suggested that during this time, the individual found at the princely burial in Prittlewell could be Sæberht. In this case, it would date to the rule of Sexred and Sæward which may be supported by its combination of heathen and Christian practices, such as the burial being within a howe and containing grave goods such as drinking horns and two gold foil crosses. This syncretism is consistent with the time period in which there was significant ideological experimentation, although the scarcity of information makes categorical identification of the individual not currently possible.

Bede does not give the year of Sæberht's death, although he implies that it was no later than 616, when Æthelberht died. On his death, his sons Sexred, Sæward and a further unnamed brother rose to power in Essex and rejected Christianity and the mission, instead allowing those in their kingdom to freely practise the traditional religion. This was likely in coordination with Eadbald, who led a similar reaction in Kent upon becoming king. Under the sons of Sæberht, Mellitus, the bishop of London, was expelled and left for Gaul. Bede does not record any active persecution of Christians at this time, however. When Eadbald was baptised around 8 years later in 624, he was seemingly unable to exert sufficient control over the East Saxon kingdom to restore the position of the Church that was set up under his father's reign, showing the limitations in his authority and the extent to which Sexred and Sæward had broken away from Kentish influence. This independence continued and all the kings of Essex remained heathen until the 650s throughout the reigns of Sexræd and Sæward and their successor Sigeberht.

=== c. 653: Baptism of Sigeberht and growth of the Church under Cedd ===
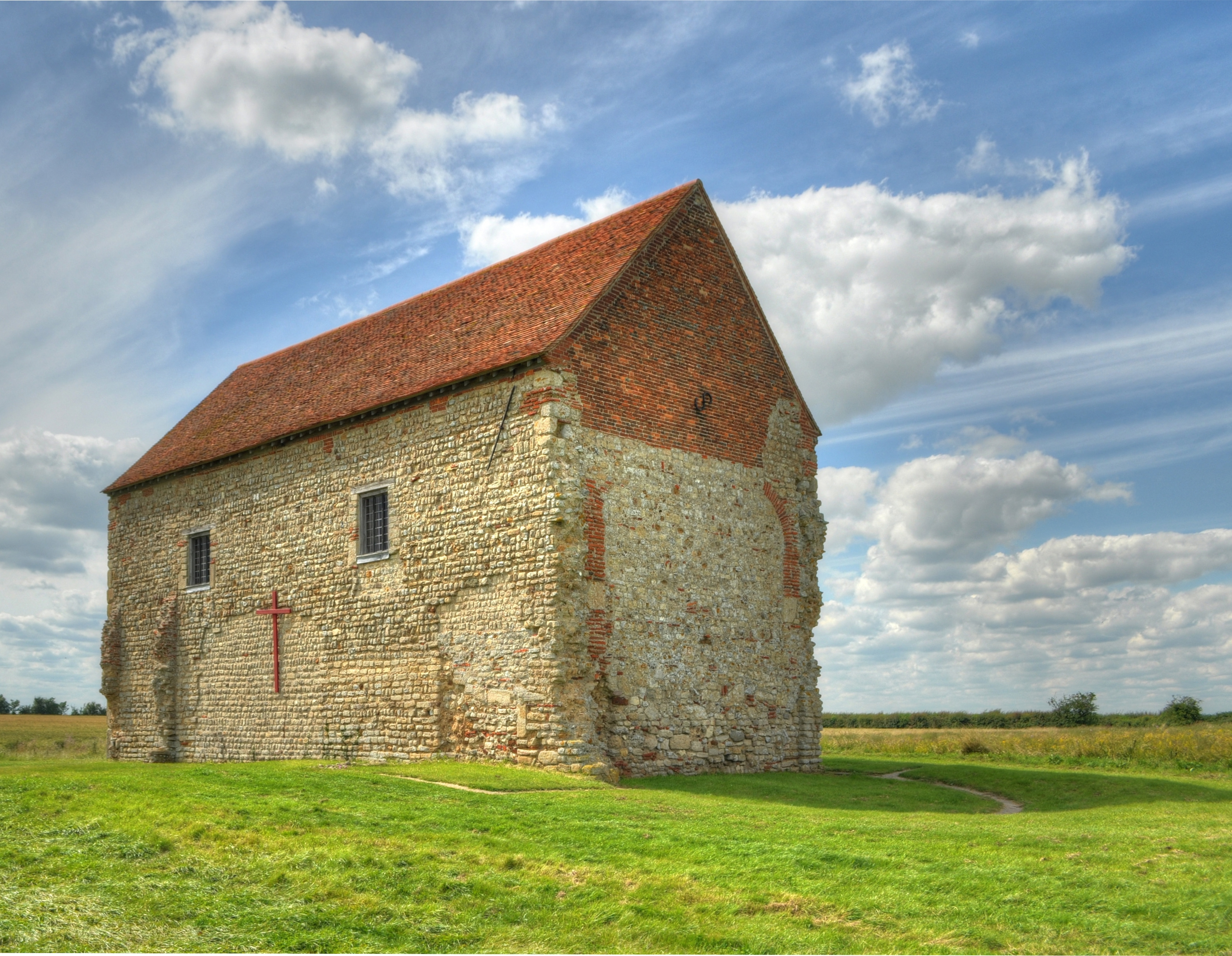
St Peter's Chapel, Bradwell-on-Sea. Established by St Cedd, the patron saint of Essex around 662, it was built on the site of the abandoned Roman Saxon Shore fort of Othona.

Bede records that in 653, Sigeberht the Good was convinced by King Ōswīg of Northumbria to convert to Christianity and be baptised by Finan of Lindisfarne. He is recorded as having contrasted the gods of the traditional religion that he deemed only physical objects with the invisible Christian God that he saw as real and almighty, which ultimately convinced Sigeberht about the truth of Christianity; this was likely invented by Bede, however, and closely resembles his account of Pope Boniface's speech to the heathen king Eadwine of Northumbria and likely draws on the Bible for inspiration. It has been suggested that the baptism was a condition of an alliance with Ōswīg against Penda of Mercia who threatened both Essex and Northumbria.

After this, Sigeberht returned to Essex with the bishop Cedd who sought to preach to the East Saxons. Bede records that due to their success, Cedd was made bishop of the Kingdom of Essex and went on to recruit more priests and deacons to assist him in Christianising the region, along with having churches built, especially at Ythanceaster and Tilaburg.

=== c. 660s onwards: Further heathen resurgences and ultimate solidification of Christianity ===
Bede describes the friction between the incoming religion and Anglo-Saxon traditions in an account of a nobleman who refused to renounce his marriage despite it being deemed unlawful by the Church. Cedd excommunicated the man and forbade Christians from associating with him or entering his home, although when invited to a feast by the man, Sigeberht accepts. In this narrative, on the way to the noble's home, Sigeberht is seen by Cedd and begs pardon for his transgression of the ruling. In response, the bishop foretells that he will die in the noble's house. This indeed happens when the king is killed by a group including the excommunicated nobleman, with Bede attributing the murder to hatred of the king stemming from his forgiveness of enemies and devotion to the teachings and morals of the Gospel. It is unclear how long after his baptism this heathen reaction occurred.

After the killing of Sigeberht, Swithhelm came to the throne and led another heathen resurgence, allowing those in their kingdom to freely practise the traditional religion. It has been suggested that he was involved in the death of his predecessor. He was later converted under influence from Æthelwold of the East Angles and his baptism took place at Rendlesham. As the date of his conversion is unclear, its political implications are unclear.

On the death of Swithhelm, Bede records that Sighere and his first cousin once removed Sæbbi jointly ruled the Kingdom of Essex, who in the genealogies are presented as the descendants of Sæberht, unlike Swithhelm. According to the Ecclesiastical History of the English People, during the great plague of 664 Sigehere returned to paganism, leading to a heathen resurgence in the parts that he ruled and becoming the last recorded East Saxon king to promote heathen practices, whilst the other half of Essex remained nominally Christian, under Sæbbi. Seeking protection from the gods from the disease, Bede writes that both nobles and those of lower social status began restoring heathen temples that had been abandoned and resumed the use of cult images in religious practice. By this time, the Kingdom of Essex had come under the authority of Wulfhere of Mercia who around 667 sent Jaruman to reconvert Sigehere and those in his kingdom and installed a new bishop of London. The political nature of this act has been noted, with it being likely that Wulfhere saw the rejection of Christianity in favour of the traditional religion as a form of rebellion against Mercian overlordship. In return, Wulfhere denied the local king influence over the cult through the chosen bishop and strengthened the authority of outside clerical institutions.

Bede records that in the 670s, the East Saxons restored derelict temples in response to severe plagues. Upon the death of Wulfhere in 675, his successor Æthelred may have been unable to maintain control over the East Saxons as all records of his involvement in Essex derive from later in his reign and the Law of Hlothhere and Eadric written between 673 and 685 suggests strong Kentish influence on London. Later on, Cædwalla likely established overlordship over the Kingdom of Essex.

== East Anglia, c. 604–630 ==
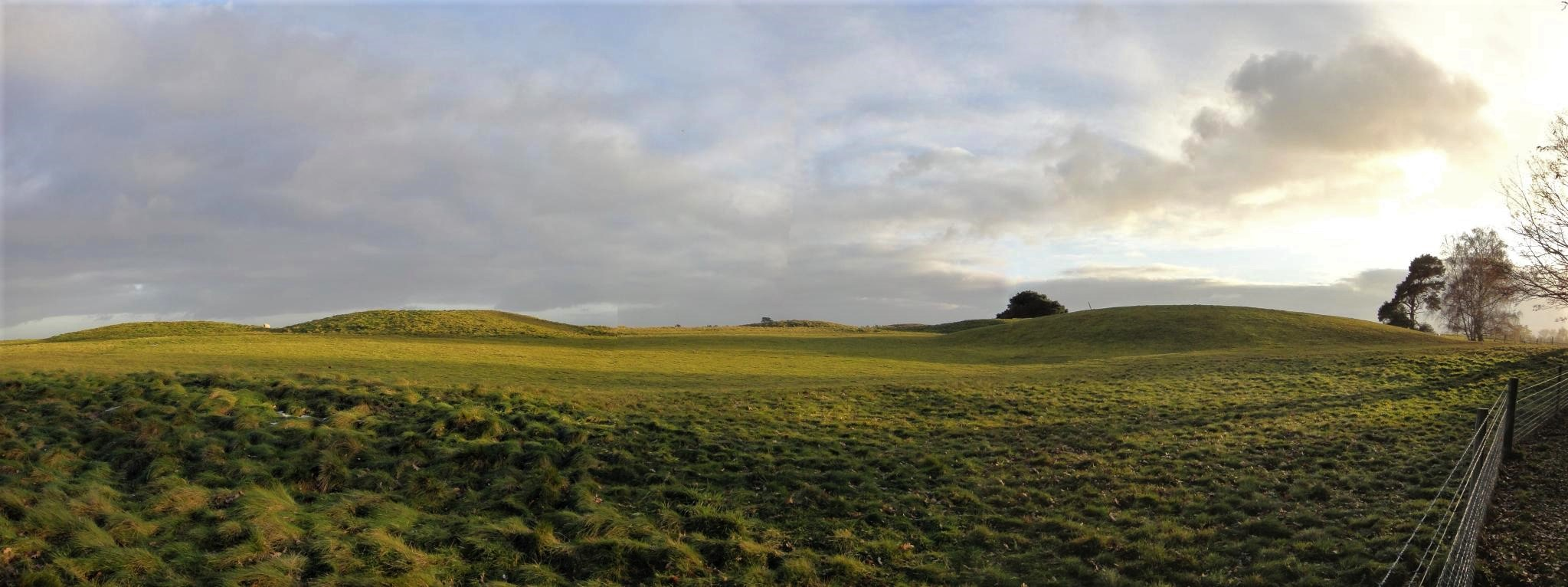
Burial site at Sutton Hoo, where both ship burials and Byzantine Christening spoons were found.

The Christianisation of East Anglia took place during the early 7th century and was closely connected to the conversion in other Anglo-Saxon kingdoms. The process began under the reign of Rædwald, who ruled as a client king under the overlordship of Æthelberht of Kent. Rædwald was probably baptised in Kent as part of Æthelberht’s efforts to extend both political and religious influence over neighbouring kingdoms, though his conversion appears to have been largely nominal and politically motivated rather than the result of genuine religious conviction. According to Bede, Rædwald later reverted to pagan practices under the influence of his wife and maintained a form of religious syncretism, keeping altars to both Christ and the traditional gods.

The limited impact of Rædwald’s conversion is reflected in the fact that his sons, Eorpwald and Sigeberht, were still heathen at the time of his death, which is usually dated to around 624. Rædwald’s temple reportedly remained standing into the reign of Ealdwulf, indicating that pagan worship continued locally for at least a generation after his death. The wealth and symbolism of the Sutton Hoo ship burial—often associated with Rædwald or a member of his dynasty have been interpreted as reflecting the persistence of traditional belief systems, possibly in conscious opposition to the spread of Christianity elsewhere in England.

Following Rædwald’s death, his son Eorpwald succeeded to the throne. Around 627, Eorpwald was baptised under the influence of Eadwine of Northumbria and the missionary Paulinus. His baptism likely took place in Northumbrian territory, as no churches were yet established in East Anglia. The conversion appears to have been politically motivated, reinforcing Northumbrian overlordship in a manner similar to Æthelberht’s earlier imposition of Christianity on Rædwald. However, Eorpwald’s acceptance of the new faith provoked resistance: within a few years he was assassinated by a heathen noble named Ricberht, who briefly seized power, suggesting a pagan backlash against Christian influence.

By around 630, Eorpwald’s brother Sigeberht returned from exile in Francia, where he had converted to Christianity, and took the East Anglian throne. His accession marked the decisive establishment of Christianity in the kingdom. Sigeberht invited Felix of Burgundy to serve as the first bishop of the East Angles, and under his patronage, a school was founded in the kingdom. There is no record of serious organised resistance to Felix’s mission, implying that previous hostility had been directed more against foreign domination than against the new religion itself.

Sigeberht’s successors continued to promote Christianity, and by the mid-7th century the East Anglian royal house was firmly Christian, along with the Kingdom. King Anna, praised by Bede for his piety, ruled during the 640s and early 650s and maintained close religious and dynastic ties with other Christian kingdoms. The East Anglian church also played an influential role in the Christianisation of neighbouring regions, particularly Essex, where King Swithhelm was baptised in East Anglia during the reign of Æthelwald.

== Northumbria, c. 625–634 ==
=== c. 604–633: Eadwine's conversion and support of Christianity ===
==== c. 604–616: Exile and contact with Christian elites ====
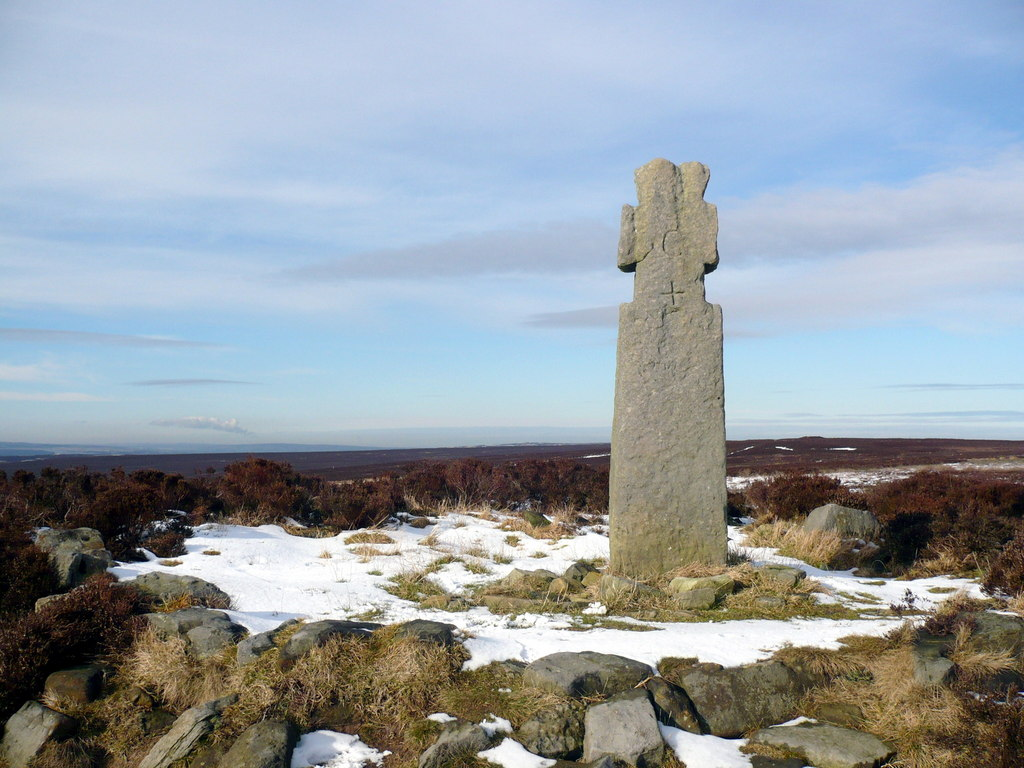
Lilla Cross in North Yorkshire, raised on the Bronze Age barrow Lilla Howe.

Edwin of Northumbria was born into the Deiran royal house around 586 and escaped from the kingdom when it was taken over by Æthelfrith of Bernicia around 604. He took refuge in Mercia and married Cwenburh of Mercia, the daughter of Cearl, with whom he had two sons: Osfrid and Eadfrid. Bede records him moving between kingdoms, possibly including Gwynedd, until he reached Rædwald in East Anglia. It has been proposed that either there, or one of the smaller kingdoms, Eadwine spent time under the protection of Christian kings and according to some manuscripts of Historia Brittonum, he was baptised during this time by a Welsh priest named Rhun who was possibly son of Urien of Rheged. Whilst the evidence for an early baptism has been described as weak, it may have served to align him with the Irish and Welsh kings in northern Britain who would have suffered under Æthelfrith. In 616, Rædwald defeated Æthelfrith at the battle of the River Idle leading to Eadwine becoming king of both Bernicia and Deira.

==== c. 619–628: Marriage to Æthelburh and baptism ====
Bede records that by 625, Eadwine had asked for the hand in marriage of Æthelburh, Eadbald's sister. This is then agreed on the condition that Eadwine allows her to practise Christianity and considers baptism himself. This dating has been questioned by Kirby, however, with it being suggested that instead 625 was when the episcopal see in York was consecrated by Paulinus, who had travelled to Eadwine's court with Æthelburh and had been part of the Gregorian mission. He proposes that the marriage could have taken place as early as 619, before Eadbald's conversion, implying that it was the Church that objected to the marriage and stipulated its conditions. As Paulinus was not consecrated until at least 625 and possibly later, which is after the latest possible date for Æthelburh's marriage it is suggested that he travelled to Northumbria prior to his consecration and only later became bishop.

After the marriage, efforts were made to convince Eadwine to convert, including letters and gifts from the pope and prophecies from Paulinus. He further had a significant victory against the West Saxons. Eadwine was ultimately baptised in 628 in York according to Kirby's proposed timeline, 3 years after his marriage to Æthelburh by Bede's dating and up to 9 years afterwards by Kirby's. Bede places the baptism on Easter Sunday, 12 April 627. Afterwards were baptised his children with Æthelburh (Æthelhun, Æthelthryth and Wuscfrea) and his grandson Yffi. It has been proposed that a large factor for Eadwine in remaining heathen was Rædwald's bretwaldaship, given that whilst in this time there is no evidence for his persecution of Christianity and he likely adopted some Christian practices, his position of power had resulted from him overcoming the overlordship of Kent and could have disliked Eadwine being baptised by members of the Kentish court.

Bede's describes how before converting, Eadwine consulted his leading men on the matter. The first to speak was the head-priest Coifi who explained that the traditional religion offers no benefits, and that they should adopt the new religion as quickly as possible and burn the temples and altars that he had hallowed. Coifi later begins the destruction of the old religion by breaking two taboos for a high priest, the mounting of a male horse and the bearing of weapons, and rode to the shrine at Goodmanham. Profaning it by casting a spear into it, he then had the temple burnt down by his companions. The historicity of this account has been questioned by scholars who have noted that whilst certain aspects resemble concepts from Germanic religion such as the forbidding of the riding of horses in holy contexts, the account shows strong parallels in Christian writings such as Gregory of Tours' description of Clovis's conversion.

==== c. 628–633: Spread of Christianity ====
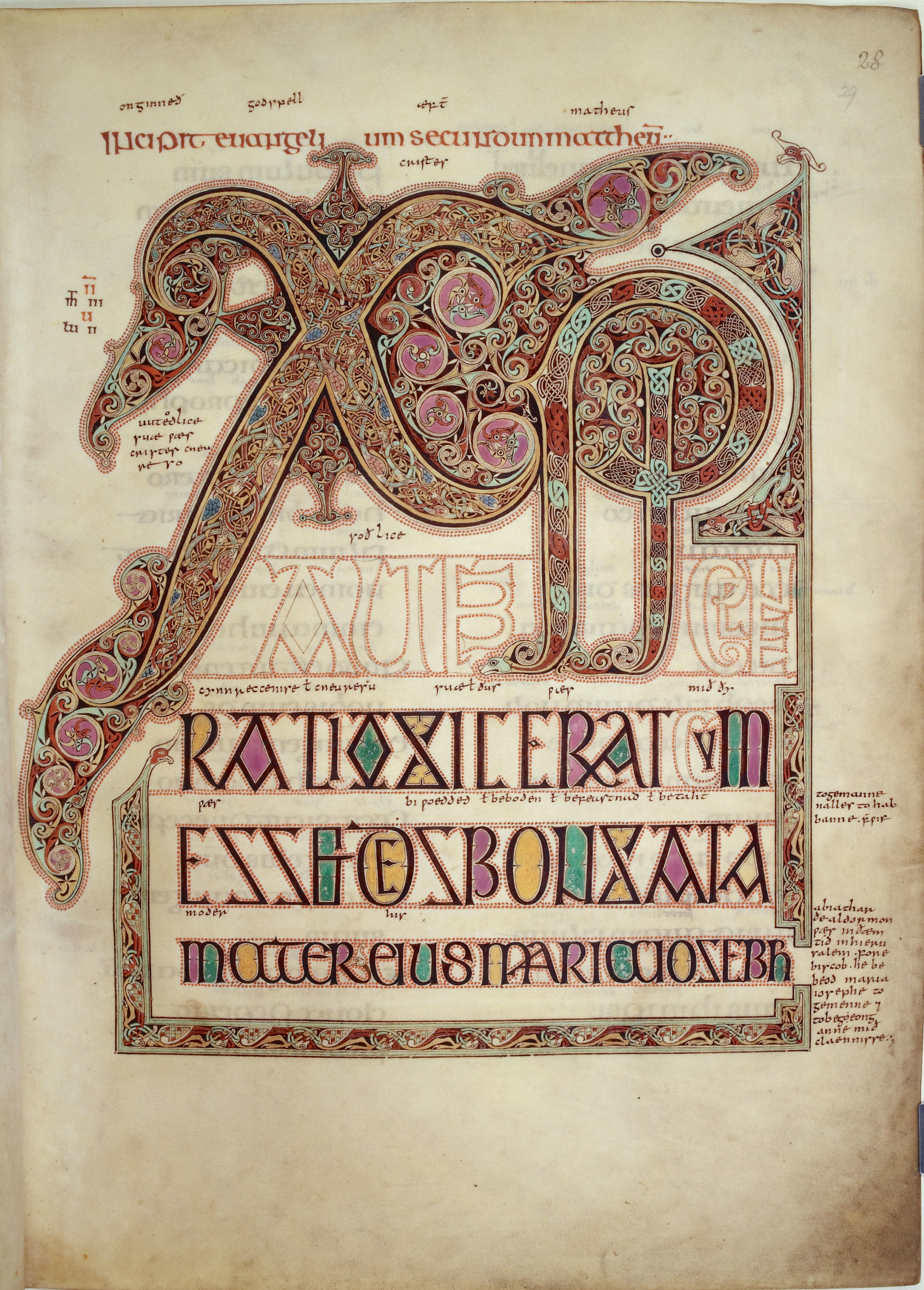
"Chi-Rho" monogram at the start of the Lindisfarne Gospel of Matthew

After his baptism around 628, Eadwine employed Christianity as a weapon for creating and expanding his state, using priests as agents in his client regions and supporting conversion as a means for political control. By the time of his conversion, the balance of power between his kingdom and that of the East Angles had shifted, allowing him to impose his new religion on the heathen king Eorpwald. During Eadwine's reign, he further conquered Elmet and likely took control of the kingdom of Lindsey. Following this, Bede records that Paulinus had a church built in Lincoln where he led a mass baptism that Eadwine attended.

Eadwine's expansionism was ultimately stopped when in 633 he was killed, along with his son Osfrith, by an alliance between the heathen king Penda of Mercia and the Christian Cadwallon ap Cadfan, king of Gwynedd at the battle of Heathfield. With this, Paulinus fled to Kent with Æthelburh, her daughter Eanflæd, her son Uscfrea and Eadwine's grandson Yffi, leaving James the deacon as the only notable clergyman in Northumbria. This has been noted to have been a major setback for the Roman mission, taking away its momentum. His death could also have been seen as a failure by God and St Peter to protect the king, damaging the credibility of the cult which he had supported. The alliance between Penda and Cadwallon has been further interpreted as a reaction against Eadwine's expansionism and enforcement of Roman Christianity.

=== c. 633–671: Heathen resurgence and the Irish mission ===
Bede records that after the death of Eadwine, Osric, Eadwine's nephew, and Eanfrith, son of Æthelfrith, were crowned kings of Deira and Bernicia respectively. He describes that both the new kings returned to open paganism upon being crowned, with Eanfrith having been baptised when in banishment among the Scots or Picts. Osric continued the war with Cadwallon and laid siege to him in a fortified stronghold where Osric was killed the following summer in a surprise attack. Cadwallon then led an attack into the English territory, killing Eanfrith when he tried to sue for peace. Bede further writes that because of their adherence to the traditional religion, it was agreed to try and destroy all memory of Osric and Eanfrith by assigning the time of their rule to their successor Oswald. His inclusion of the kings in his history is likely, as with the other kings who returned to paganism, to demonstrate how God punishes apostates.

Eanfrith's brother Oswald, who had been baptised among the Irish of Dál Riada, succeeded them and killed Cadwallon in the autumn of the year after Eadwine's death (634 or 635) at the battle of Heavenfield. During his rule, he asked the monastery of Iona for a bishop to lead the Hiberno-Scottish mission in the conversion of Northumbria, however the man they sent was ineffective and returned to Iona. Aidan was sent to replace him who established a monastery on Lindisfarne to act as a hub for the mission which later became the effective ecclesiastical centre of England for 30 years due to the political power of Northumbria and the quality of its monks. Oswald further established control over Lindsey again and brought Mercia into a submissive position. His power likely extended as far south as the upper Thames valley by around 640, when he acted as a sponsor to King Cynegils of Wessex at his baptism. He further had close relations with the Irish and may have had military support from Dál Riada in his ascent to the throne. Oswald died at the battle of Maserfelth in 642 at the hands of Penda.

Oswald was succeeded by his brother Oswig who reigned until 671 and similarly played an important role in the spread of Christianity from Northumbria to the rest of England, persuading Sigeberht of Essex to convert and stipulating that Peada of Mercia was baptised before marrying Oswig's daughter Alchflæd. During his reign, in 651, Aidan died after being bishop for 16 years.

== Mercia, c. 653–655 ==
=== c. 653–655: Peada's baptism and Penda's death ===
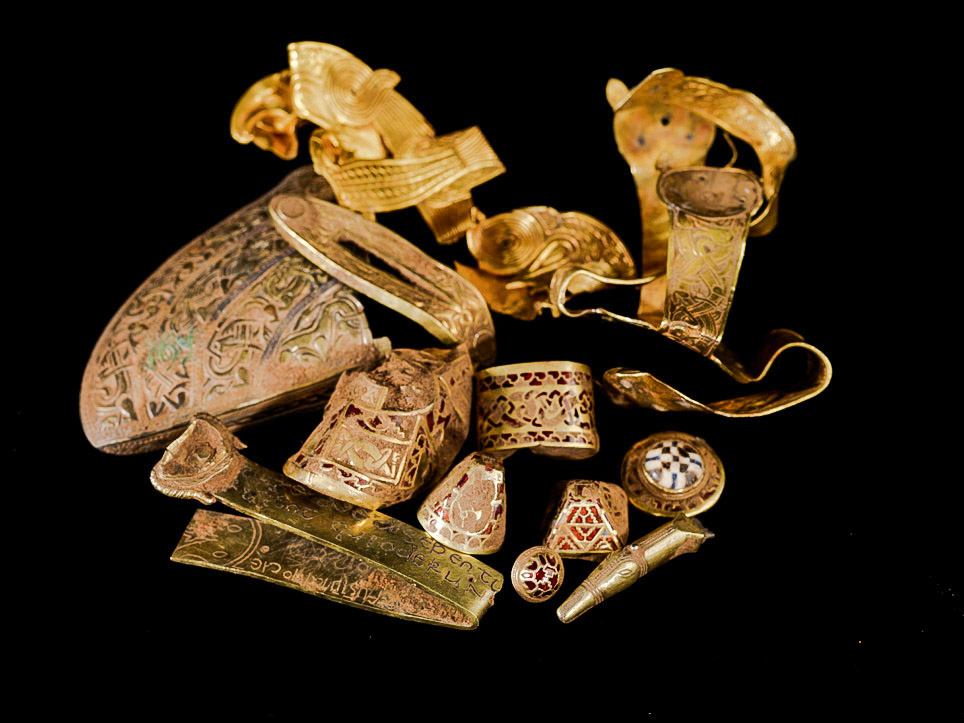
Objects from the Staffordshire Hoard, likely made over the period from the mid to late 6th century to the mid to late 7th century.

The year in which Penda became king of Mercia is unclear, with Bede claiming he came to the throne in 633 after his victory over Eadwine of Deira at the battle of Heathfield. At this time, Bede further records that both Penda and the other Mercians were heathen. During his kingship he extended the borders of Mercia to the north, east and south through military victories. Though Bede does not list him as a bretwalda, at the time of his death he was dominant over the southern English kingdoms and throughout his life he upheld alliances with the Welsh kingdom of Gwynedd. Penda's adherence to the traditional religion led to him being regarded as a distinct other to the Northumbrians, with Bede describing his acts as evil and recording that Bishop Aiden performed a miracle to stop the king burning down the royal seat at Bamburgh. In addition to killing Eadwine, he further killed Oswald of Northumbria at the battle of Maserfelth.

Penda's son Peada was raised heathen but was baptised by Bishop Finan around 653 in order to marry Alchflæd upon stipulation from her father Oswig. At this time, he had been appointed by his father to rule over the Middle Angles and Bede records that alongside him, his nobles and þegns were also baptised. Bede further records that Penda allowed Christianity to be preached in Mercia after this.

In 655, Penda was killed at the battle of the Winwæd and the Anglo-Saxon chronicle records that the Mercians became Christian.

=== c. 655 onwards: Solidification of Christianity ===
After Penda's death in 655, his son Peada, who was Oswig's son-in-law, became king of the southern Mercians. Peada was killed within a year, with Bede attributing the killing to his wife. Two or three years later, there was an uprising led by Mercian elites that put Penda's Christian son Wulfhere on the throne who ruled from 658 to 675. Wulfhere oversaw the conversion of Mercia and some of the areas that were under its dominance, such as Essex where he sent Jaruman to convert them after they returned to paganism during the plague of 664. Wulfhere was succeeded by Æthelred who both led military successes and ultimately became a monk.

== Sussex, c. 675–681 ==
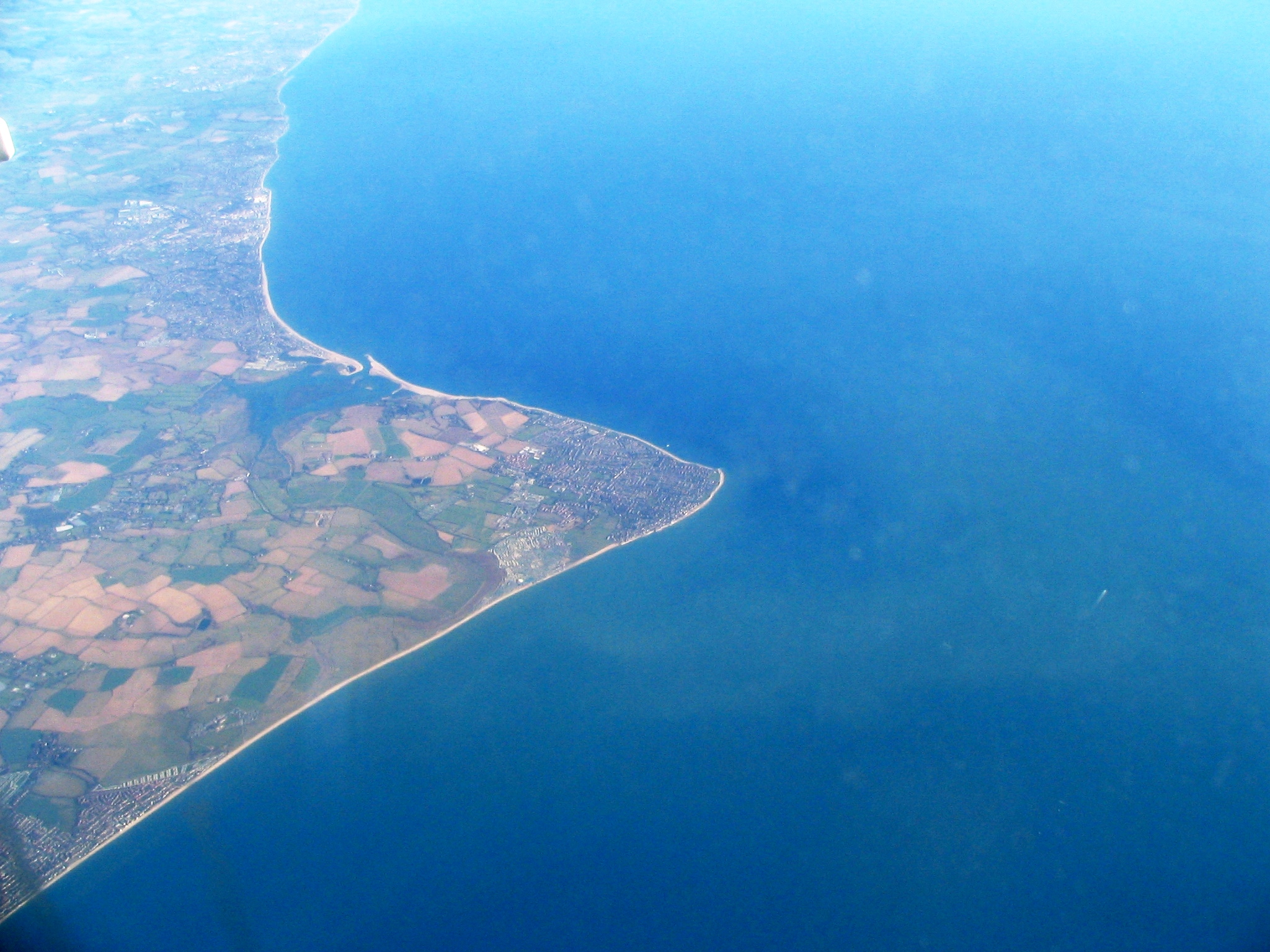
Selsey in West Sussex, where an episcopal see was founded by St Wilfrid

=== c. 681: Preaching of Bishop Wilfrid and widespread baptism ===
The written evidence for the foundation of a bishopric in Sussex comes from Wilfrids biographer Stephen of Ripon and Bedes Ecclesiastical History of the English People completed in about 731. Their narrative says that [in about 681] Bishop Wilfrid, who had been expelled from Northumbria, began preaching in Sussex, which up until that point had remained widely heathen. Stephen of Ripon's Life of St Wilfrid notes that Sussex was inaccessible, having a rocky coast and thick forests, which allowed it to maintain its independence. At this point, the local king, Æthelwealh of Sussex, had been baptised in Mercia under influence from Wulfhere, who had become his godfather. Wulfhere died in 675, providing a latest possible date for the baptism, and was succeeded by Æthelred of Mercia, who was ruling in 681. At the time of Æthelwealh's conversion, he was married to Eafe, a Christian Lady originally from Hwicce, whose religion may have influenced his decision to be baptised.

Bede records that several prominent ealdormen and þegns were baptised around 681, followed by the rest of the people of the kingdom. In Wilfrid's biography, he is recorded as having preached to the South Saxons by emphasising that the Kingdom of God was imminently arriving and that those who had not been baptised and who upheld idolatry would be damned to eternal punishment. The conversion of the South Saxons was supported by Æthelwealh and implicitly Mercia, which was dominant over Sussex at the time. Stephen records that the king gave his vill to Wilfrid, plus eighty-seven hides, at Selsey, to found a minster. Whilst Wilfrid was in Sussex, the kingdom was invaded by Cædwalla of Wessex, and Æthelwealh was killed. The Life of St Wilfrid describes how during this time, Wilfrid was still converting the South Saxons and was given land by Cædwalla after his conquest.

Modern academics have questioned the narrative provided by Stephen and Bede. Kirby suggests that Stephen's "Life of Wilfrid" was extremely partisan, as its purpose was to magnify Wilfrid as well as vindicate him. Bede's "Ecclesiastical History" takes a more nuanced view, possibly as Bede did not approve of Wilfrid and did not simply copy Stephen's "Life". Henry Mayr-Harting writes that it would have been easy for Bede just to copy from Stephen's "Life" into his own "Ecclesiastical History", but experience equipped him to deal with the "difficulty of sources". According to Michael Shapland it is possible that on Wilfrid's arrival, the people of Sussex would already have been "Insular Christians" and that Stephen and Bede suppressed this knowledge in their works. The anomalies in the formative narrative of Sussex by Stephen and Bede suggest a possibly biased historical account of Wilfrid's successful Christianisation of Sussex.

== Wessex, c. 635–688 ==
=== c. 604: Augustine's synods and legends ===
Though Augustine's work during the Gregorian mission was almost wholly limited to Kent, he is recorded as having taken part in two unsuccessful synods held after the death of Pope Gregory around 604 at Augustine's Oak, which lay on the border of Hwicce and Wessex. At the first synod, Augustine was supported by Æthelberht of Kent and his aim was to get the British clergy to accept the authority of Rome and conform to Roman practices.

The likely historicity of the synods, combined with the lack of detail on their location allowed for legends regarding Augustine to develop. Some of these are recorded by the monk Goscelin in his Life of Augustine. He records that the saint travelled with a company into Dorset in Wessex, where they reached a village whose inhabitants adhered to the traditional religion. The heathens refused to listen to the preaching, attached fish tails to the missionaries and drove them away. In retaliation, Augustine causes them to grow their own tails through a curse. The village was located near Cerne Abbey and has been suggested to be Muckleford. The story, along with others from the work, is likely ahistorical, with Cerne Abbey being founded in the 10th century and the association with Augustine likely being a later innovation. The tale is also likely have been created to explain the European insult that the English were born with tails.

=== c. 635–636: Baptism of Cynegils and Cwichelm ===
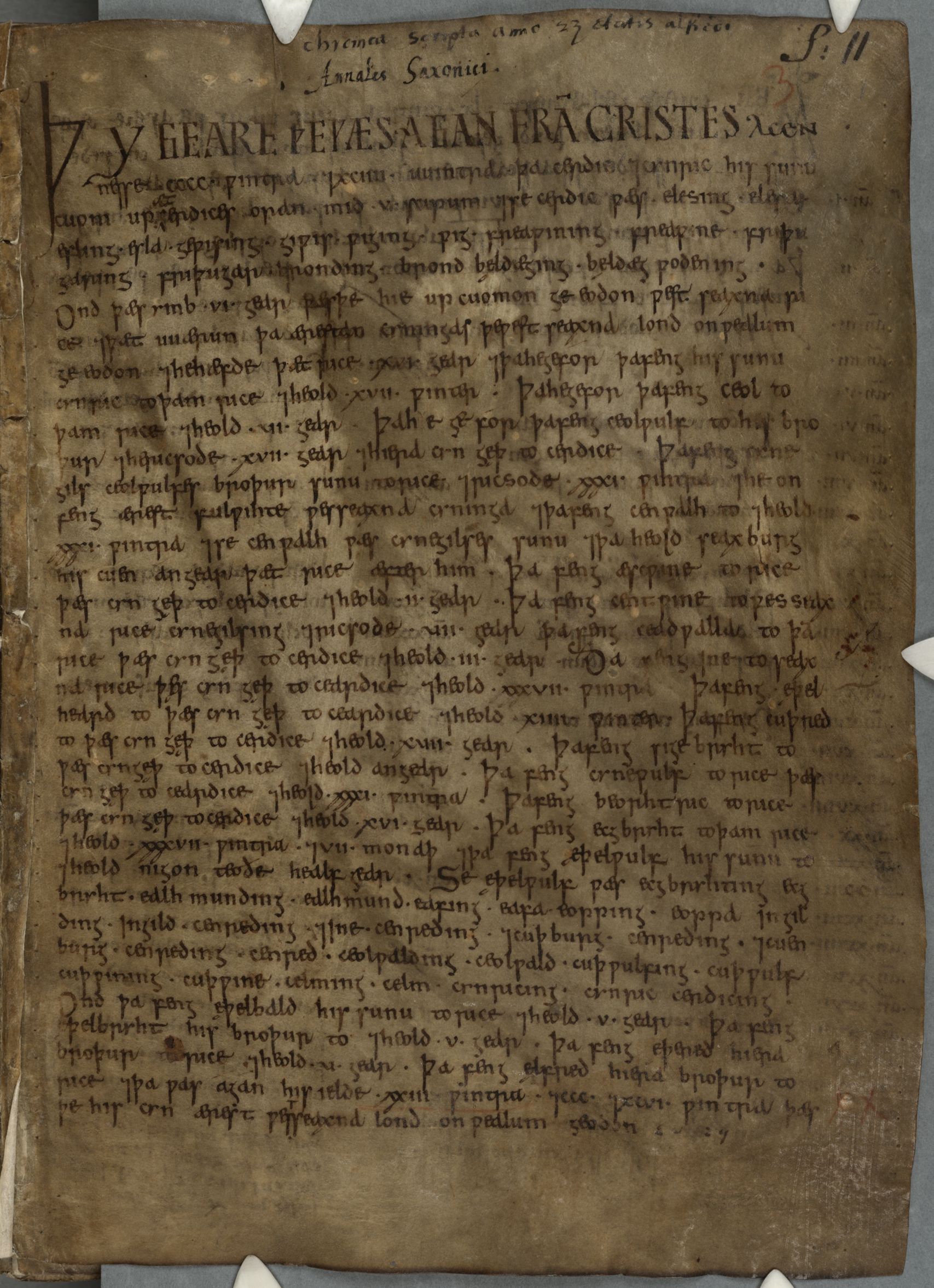
A page from Corpus Christi College Cambridge MS 173, which contains the oldest surviving copy of Ine's laws.

Bede states that Birinus was sent by Pope Honorius I to the most remote English regions to preach, travelling to the Gewisse in the mid 630s, who Bede equates with the West Saxons, as they were known during his time of writing. He claims that Wessex was wholly heathen when this took place, although at this time the West Saxon kingdom, like many of the other English kingdoms, contained a diverse group of communities including British Christians and possibly an organised church hierarchy, especially in the west. It has been suggested that this papal initiative may have been spurred on by the killing of Eadwine, the first Christian king of the northern Angles.

In 635, Cynegils, who had become king around 611, was baptised by Birinus, with King Oswald standing as godfather. Cwichelm was baptised the year after Cynegils, in 636, also by Bishop Birinus and died later that year. It has been proposed that during most of Cynegils' reign, he likely ruled in partnership with his son Cwichelm.

=== c. 642–688: Crowning of heathen kings and their later baptisms ===
When Cynegils died, he was succeeded by his son Cenwalh in 642, who was heathen and refused to accept Christianity. Shortly after becoming king, Cenwalh was driven from Wessex into exile by Penda, taking refuge with Anna of the East Angles. Bede attributes the conflict to Cenwalh, who had wed Penda's sister, taking another wife. Cenwalh was baptised in 646 under influence from Anna. It is unknown who was ruling Wessex in his absence, however he returned some time after his baptism and became king again. During his reign he appointed both Agilbert and Wini as bishops, however due to disagreements there was a period in which there were no bishops in the kingdom. The Anglo-Saxon chronicle dates the appointment of Agilbert to 650 and it has been suggested that he may have left Wessex for the Frankish Kingdom around 660 when the West Saxons were losing control of the upper Thames valley to Mercia. The period without bishops came to an end in 670 when Leuthere was appointed and consecrated.

Cenwalh died in 672, whereupon sources give differing accounts of who succeeded him. The Anglo-Saxon Chronicle records that Cenwalh was succeeded by his wife Seaxburh who ruled for a year before being succeeded by Æscwine who ruled from 674 to 676 who was in turn succeeded by Centwine who ruled from 676 to 685. It has been noted though that the West Saxon Genealogical Regnal List and Anglo-Saxon Chronicle are both shaped by the desires of the writer to trace an unbroken line back from the Kingdom of Wessex to the legendary founder Cerdic and Gewis and likely present an ahistorical simplification. In Bede's account, Wessex was split into a number of smaller regions ruled by many kings for around 10 years. His account is typically understood to mean that it was Cædwalla who reunified Wessex around 685, however Barbara Yorke has proposed an alternative interpretation in which Centwine instead did this, before being succeeded by Cædwalla. Centwine was heathen through the late 670s and early 680s, ultimately converting shortly before his abdication around 685, when he became a monk. Despite adhering to the traditional religion for most of his reign, he is praised for his building of churches and abdication in a poem by Aldhelm written between 689 and 709.

Cædwalla became king around 686 and supported the Church throughout his reign, though was not baptised until he went to Rome in 689 after having abdicated the year before. In doing so, he became the first Anglo-Saxon king to abdicate to go to Rome. In the south-east, he is recorded as having given land at Hoo in Kent to an abbot and land at Farnham in Surrey for the founding of a monastery. He also granted significant estates to Wilfrid in Wight after having vowed to conquer the island and exterminate its population for being heathen. When the local king Arwald's two younger brothers were caught on the mainland fleeing the invasion, Cædwalla had them baptised and executed.

=== c. 688–726: Enforcement of Christianity through Ine's law code ===
Ine of Wessex succeeded Cædwalla in 689 and was a strong supporter of the Church, giving funds to ecclesiastical sites such as those at Malmesbury and Mulchney. He also increased their freedom, allowing them to operate independently from secular affairs in a similar way to what had been previously established in Kentish and Frankish kingdoms.

The laws attributed to him record that they were legislated with the support of his leading men and in the presence of Church officials. They are the first recorded for the Kingdom of Wessex and enforce adherence to Christian practices, including making compulsory the paying of church scot and the baptising of one's children within 30 days, with fines to be imposed on those who don't comply. It also further specifies that if a lord makes his þēowman work on a Sunday then that slave is to be set free, while if a freeman works on a Sunday then he is to be enslaved as punishment. Ine's laws also put greater legal weight on oaths made by those who took Communion than those who didn't.

== Wihtwara, c. 661–686 ==
=== c. 656–661: Preaching and later invasion by Wulfhere ===
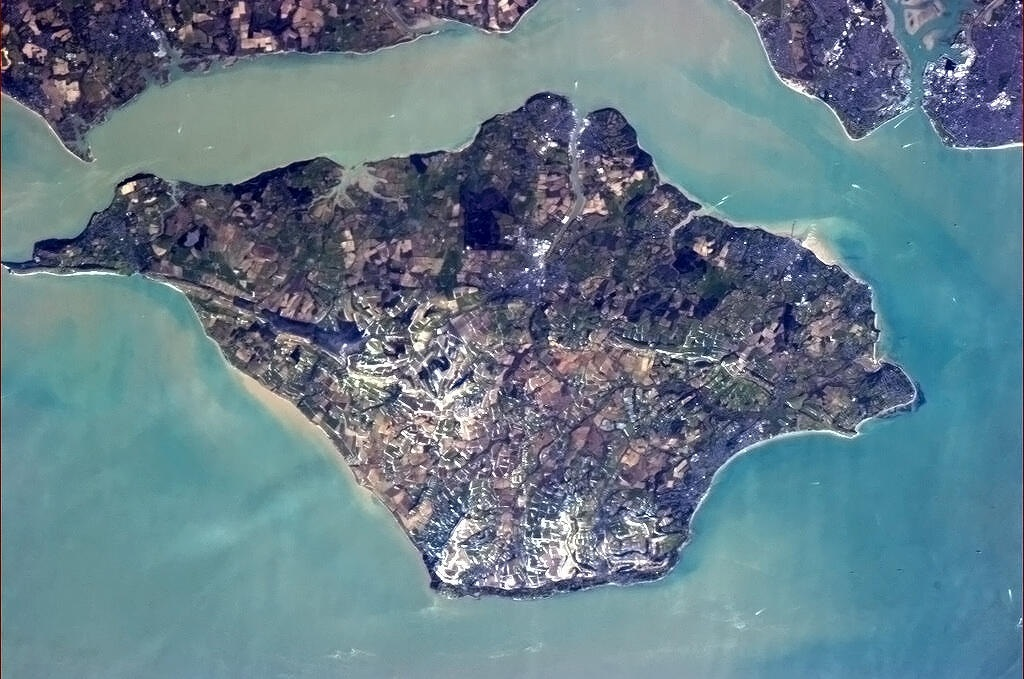
The Isle of Wight - the extent of the recorded territory of Wihtwara in the 7th century

The kingdom of the Wihtwara consisted of the Isle of Wight and was a minor kingdom in Britain in the 7th century. The Anglo-Saxon Chronicle records that in 656 Wulfhere of Mercia ordered the priest Eoppa to preach in Wihtwara.

It later states that in 661, Wulfhere attacked Wihtwara, taking control of it and giving it to Æthelwalh of Sussex to rule as a baptism present. Bede on the other hand places the events to shortly before Wilfrid's mission to the southern Saxons in the mid 680s, suggesting a later date. The chronicle's entry in 661 further records that in this year Eoppa became the first man to bring baptism to Wight after following the orders of Wulfhere and Wilfrid.

=== c. 686: Invasion and forced conversion under Cædwalla ===
In 686 according to Anglo-Saxon Chronicle A, Cædwalla of Wessex invaded Wihitwara. Bede records that at that time all in Wihtwara were heathen and that Cædwalla tried to slaughter without mercy every inhabitant of Wihtwara, planning to populate the island afresh with West Saxons. He also promised that if he was successful in conquering the island, he would give a fourth of it to the Church.

During Cædwalla's invasion, the local king Arwald was killed and his two younger brothers fled to the mainland where they were captured by the West Saxon forces. Cædwalla, who had been wounded during the fighting, ordered them to be executed but a bishop convinced him to have the boys baptised before killing them. Bede records that these were the first from the island who believed and were saved. He then writes that when "the executioner came, they joyfully underwent the temporal death, through which they did not doubt they were to pass to the life of the soul, which is everlasting" and that Christianity was then imposed on Wight. (Note: The original text in Latin is as follows: "Moxque illi instante carnifice mortem laeti subiere temporalem, per quam se ad uitam animae perpetuam non dubitabant esse transituros") After taking control of Wight, he upheld his former oath, giving large estates to Wilfrid and from this point onwards, the inhabitants were under West Saxon domination. They are further recorded by 731 to be administered in Church matters by the bishop of Winchester.

== Viking Age Scandinavian settlement: c. 865–954 ==
=== c. 865–954: Arrival and conversion of North-Germanic populations ===
==== Introduction of Old Nordic religion ====
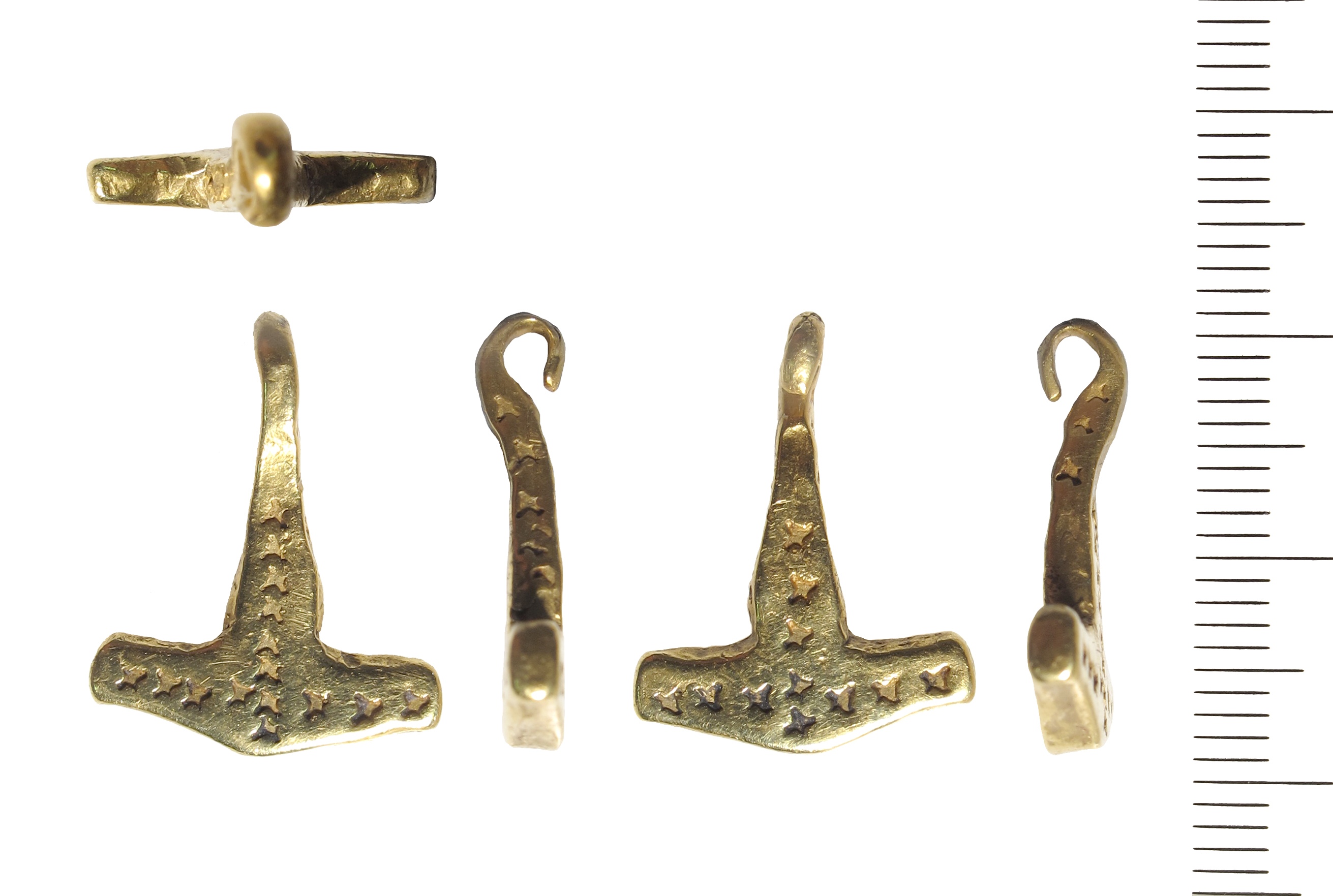
Golden Thor's hammer pendant from Lincolnshire

The continuous movement of people across the North Sea into Britain from the later Roman period and throughout the early and middle Anglo-Saxon periods had a period of increased intensity starting in the 9th century, with records describing some instances of Danish armies overwintering in England in the 850s. A significant development occurred in 865 when the Great Heathen Army landed in Britain, conquering large parts of the kingdoms of Northumbria and Mercia, and all of East Anglia, before settling in these regions. This led to a significant migration from Scandinavia to northern and eastern England of North-Germanic people who spoke Old Norse, a language likely mutually intelligible with Old English due to their close relation. Despite some exposure to Christianity throughout the 9th century from missionaries and traders, the kings in Scandinavia only began to convert around the mid 10th century and most of the settlers in England practised Nordic forms of Germanic paganism that had important links and similarities with traditional Anglo-Saxons practices. Consistent with this, the Anglo-Saxon Chronicle repeatedly refers to the migrants as hæþene ("heathen").

While physical evidence of Old Nordic religion being practised in England is not extensive, possibly resulting from the quick cultural assimilation of the settlers, it is attested by a small number of discovered burials with characteristic features such as furnishing with grave goods, cremations and the building of barrows. In the south and middle of the Danelaw in Nottinghamshire and Derbyshire, notable examples include those at Repton, attributed to the camp of the Great Heathen Army over the winter of 873 to 874, and the likely late-9th-century Heath Wood barrow cemetery, which contains around 59 mounds and has been noted to closely resemble practices in northern Jutland and Sweden. There also is further evidence that suggests disturbed heathen graves such as the find of a sword in the Farndon churchyard. Similarly, the numerous metal-detected finds in Lincolnshire possibly result from graves disturbed by ploughing, although no pagan graves have yet been recorded in the area. Horse burials have also been found at sites such as Reading and Leigh-on-Sea, with two examples being found in the mostly conventional Christian cemeteries in Sedgeford and Saffron Walden that may have resulted through usage by Anglo-Scandinavian communities. Thor's Hammer pendants have also been found, such as that from Grave 511 at St Wystan's Church in Repton, which also had a boar tusk placed between the thighs and the humerus of a jackdaw which was possibly in a bag at the time of burial.

Other practices that had become rare since the Christianisation of the Anglo-Saxons were also upheld again during the time of North-Germanic settlement, including the deposition of items in wetlands, likely as votive offerings. It has been suggested that these practices may have been followed only by Scandinavians or that the migrations also led to a resurgence in Anglo-Saxon heathen customs.

==== Decline of the Church in Scandinavian areas ====
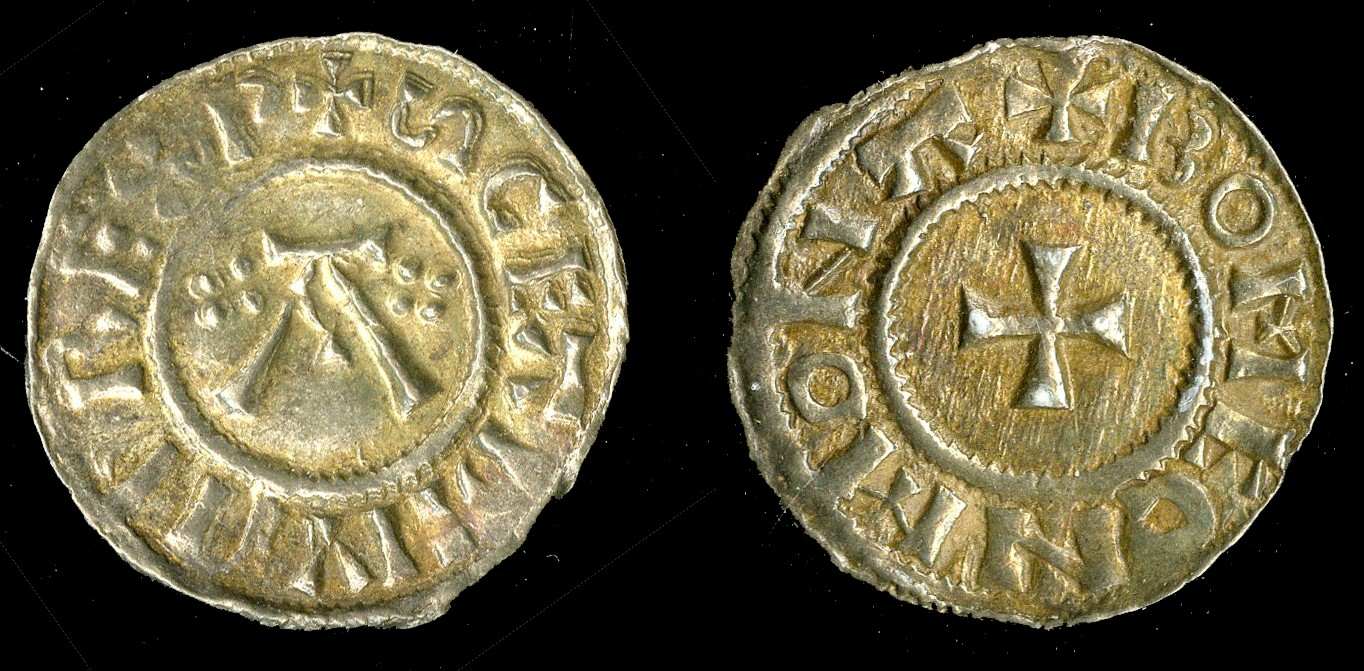
Penny likely minted in East Anglia during Scandinavian rule, commemorating St Edmund

Due to the scarcity of evidence, it is difficult to discern between disruption to Churches before and after the Scandinavian settlement and the force causing it. Despite this, the disruption to the succession of bishops and the changing of diocesan organisation in the Danelaw suggest that the wars and occupations during the 9th and early 10th centuries have a strong negative impact on the Church, potentially limiting its ability to convert the settlers.

While it has been argued that Alfred's reformers and other 10th-century writers exaggerated the scale of the destruction, supported by continuity of religious communities in some areas, by the 10th century many prominent monastic communities had disappeared such as at Jarrow, Coldingham and Whitby. The only surviving communities in Lincolnshire and Yorkshire were episcopal ministers that were protected through the survival of the archbishop of York. Writers at the time discuss the decline of religious houses in the North leading to the moving of relics formerly held there to Canterbury and the shrine at Ripon being neglected and overgrown. Many areas continued to lack bishops until the second half of the 10th century, with some bishoprics never being restored in the Middle Ages like at Hexham and Leicester. That this continued even after the conquest of Scandinavian territories by the kings of Wessex has been suggested to have resulted from political policies aimed at increasing the power of the West Saxon dynasty. Pope Formosus, who was pope from 891 to 896, wrote the Anglo-Saxon bishops to urge them to fill the empty posts and remember their obligations to the Church, referering the new resurgence "of the abominable rites of the pagans" and "violation of the Christian faith". This is typically interpreted by scholars to refer to the scarcity of bishops in the Danelaw.

Christian culture depended on organisational structure in the form of churches and priests to provide baptisms, instruction and places of worship. Because of this, the ability for Christianity to be adopted by Scandinavians in England in parts with seeming absence or serious weakening of Church institutions has been questioned.

==== Adoption of Christianity ====
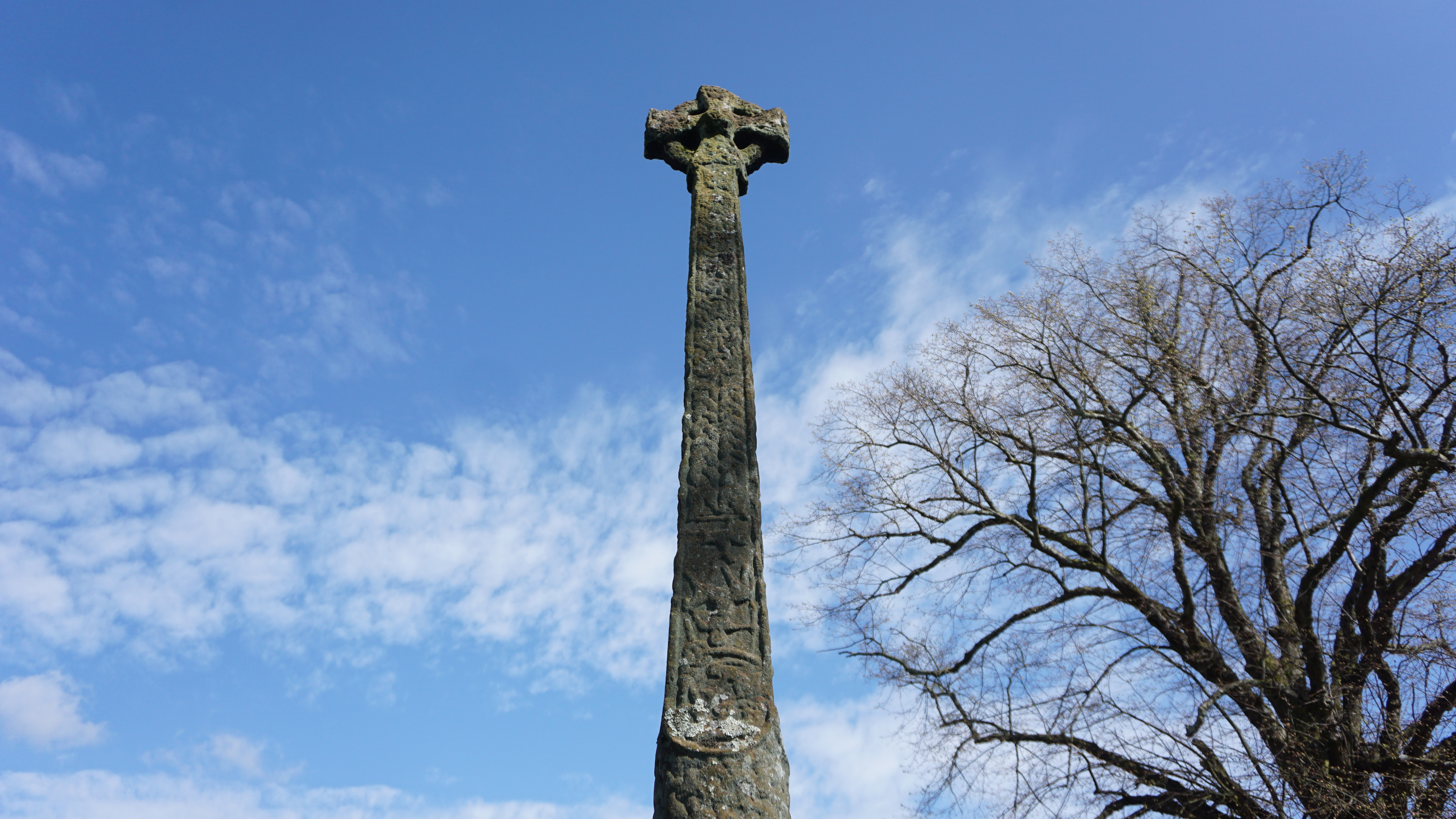
The Gosforth Cross in Cumberland, which features images from Nordic mythology

It is unclear when Scandinavian settlers in the Viking Age adopted Christianity, with evidence suggesting that the speed of adoption varied by region and most scholars supporting the idea that it happened within several generations. The means by which they were converted is not preserved, with no records of missionary activity, possibly explained by the low number of surviving records from the late 9th century until the end of the first half of the 10th century. Despite this, the process of conversion among the elites is attested as having begun in the 9th century, with no more examples in England taking place after the mid 10th century.

Despite the scarcity of evidence, a small number of baptised Scandinavians are attested to in the 9th century. In some cases, baptism happened for political reasons such for the East Anglian king Guðrum and 30 members of his army after defeat by King Alfred in 878. Hásteinn's wife and sons are also recorded as being baptised in 893. Further examples include a man at Alfred's new foundation in Athelney during the 890s, recorded in Asser's Life of King Alfred and a man named Oda, who came to England with Ubba and Ívarr who is also described as having been fostered by a man who was the bishop of Ramsbury and later the archbishop of Canterbury. The Historia de Sancto Cuthberto records the inauguration around 883 of Guðrøðr, a Danish king in Northumbria, in which he swore oaths on Cuthbert's relics and partook in ring giving, a practice central in Germanic heathen kingship. It has been suggested that the involvement of the Church in this event should necessarily be interpreted as meaning that the Danes converted at this time given the following of heathen practice as well, and may have been a means of acquiring support from an important institution during an unstable time. Similar cooperation with the Church and synchretism is seen in the minting of coins in Scandinavian areas such as Lincoln and York, which variously combine motifs such as crosses, Thor's hammers, and saints' names.

The kings of Wessex took control of East Anglia in 917 and periodically gained control over the Kingdom of York throughout the 10th century, with the Scandinavian kings of York possibly submitting to West Saxon control to build legitimacy in their rule. Around 918, a Norse-Gael dynasty became established in England, leading to further immigration of adherents to Old Nordic religion. According to the Anglo-Saxon Chronicle, they remained heathen upon settling. Among these were Óláfr Sigtryggsson and Røgnvaldr Guðrøðsson who were baptised in 943. Furthermore, Egils saga states that Egil and Þórólfr had to undergo provisional baptism before serving in King Æthelstan's army. Other late Scandinavian sources also describe the political conversion of Erik Bloodaxe, who died in 954 as the last Scandinavian king of York after being expelled by King Eadred who brought the kingdom under West Saxon control. His religion at point of death is unclear, however, with the skaldship Eiríksmál describing Óðinn welcoming him to Valhöll. In reference to his rule over Northumbria, King Eadred, who was king of the English from 946 to 955, used the title gubernator paganorum. Similarly, Danes in Bedfordshire and Derbyshire who sold land no later than 911 are referred to as pagani. (Note: The latest possible date of 911 is given by the year of death of Æthelred.) It is unclear, however, if the term pagani is being used in these contexts to mean heathen Scandinavians or all Scandinavians more generally, perhaps as an insult.

The nominal adoption of Christianity in Danish Mercia seems to have taken place by 942, whereupon they are contrasted with the heathen Northmen, and by the second half of the 10th century, conversions of Scandinavians in England are widely attested in a range of sources. By the end of the 10th century, Christianity in Scandinavian regions is attested by a number of sources such as Scandinavian church patrons and sculptures that merge Scandinavian art styles with Christian English stonework techniques.

=== c. Late 10th–11th centuries: Migrations to the Kingdom of England and the suppression of heathen practices ===
In the early 11th century, a large numbers of law codes and other works were written that criticised and forbade heathen practices. A prominent figure in the production of these was Ælfric of Eynsham, whose works include De falsis diis, which gives a euhemeristic account on how the "false gods" were in fact important men who after their death became treated as gods and worshipped. In it, he equates Roman gods with Germanic ones, with him stating that Jove, who the Danes call Þor, was the most worshipped of the gods in the past and that the devil taught people long ago to worship Mercury, who the Danes called Othon, and brought him offerings at crossroads and on high hills. Ælfric's works were known by Wulfstan, who was Archbishop of York from 1002 to 1023 and adapted his own version De falsis diis based on Ælfric's, which has been noted to show concern over the continuation of paganism. Wulfstan attributed the worsening conditions in England to moral failings, urging people to fast as penance and asserted the need for everyone to cast out heathendom and spread Christianity in his works such as Sermo Lupi ad Anglos, Sermo de baptismate and Sermo ad populum. Similar terminology is used in the law codes that he was involved in writing and which bear his distinctive style.

After Cnut the Great's conquest of England in 1016, and perhaps throughout the century before, new settlers arrived from Denmark who were either still adhering to the traditional religion or were recently converted. Such a continuation of Old Nordic religion in the 11th-12th centuries may be attested by the Saltfleetby spindle-whorl which bears a younger fuþark inscription interpreted as a charm calling for help from the gods Óðinn and Heimdallr.

== Rulers' reasons for and against conversion ==
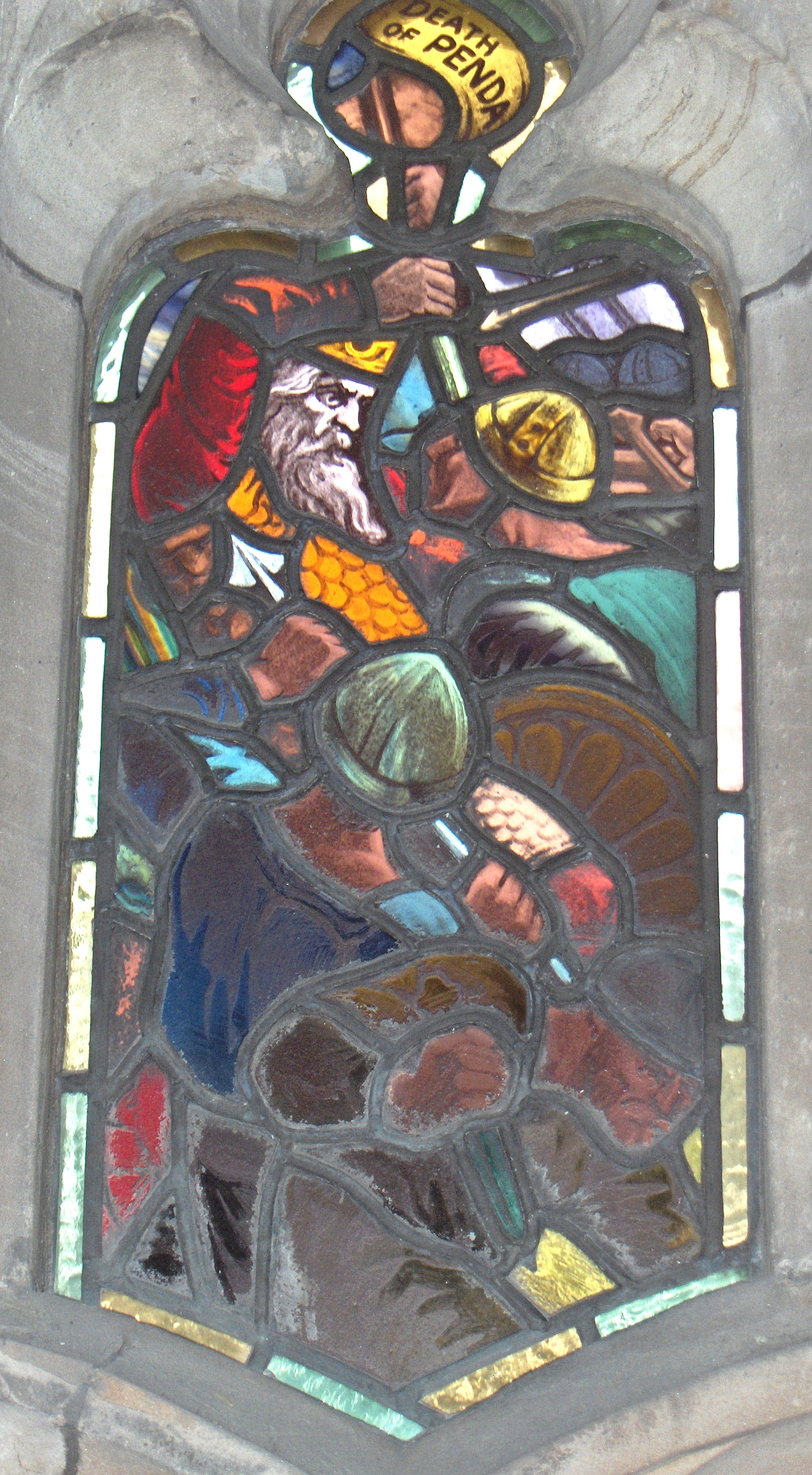
Stained glass depiction of the death of the heathen king Penda at the hands of the Christian king Oswiu's army

Bede attributes the conversion of English kings to be due to the inherent truth of the religion. This stance was continued by scholars into the early 20th century when there was a shift towards a more secular understanding of history. New lines of argumentation focused on the usefulness of Christianity both from a practical and ideological standpoint. Missionaries in the early Middle Ages employed a top-down approach in which they focussed on the most powerful in society, aiming to persuade them, so that they in turn would persuade their subjects.

Scholars have argued that one of these persuading factors was that Christianity offered a new institutional framework for kingdom cohesion and new ways for powerful kings to assert control over those who were less powerful. The Church was also an alternative means of increasing one's status and power; becoming a monk or nun also enabled secular elites to avoid marriage, difficult political conditions and family duties. Early medieval rulers also looked to Rome for legitimacy and ways of asserting power; the close association of Christianity with the strength and empire of Rome could thus have made it a powerful tool. With the Church also came a book-writing tradition and increased literacy, aiding in bureaucracy.

Nonetheless, many kings remained heathen, possibly due to an unwillingness to harm relations with the elites on which they depended to remain in power, many of whom likely saw Christianity as intrusive and unwelcome. Ecclesiastical History of the English People refers to the importance of this support in the baptism of the king of the East Saxons Sigeberht. King Edwin of Northumbria is also said to have sought advice from his council before converting. Funding the Church was very costly, with land being given away forever. In the 7th century, parts of the land taken by force from heathen kings could be given to the Church, as in Cædwalla's conquest of the Isle of Wight, in which he gave a quarter of the island to Wilfrid, totalling 300 hides. Similarly, King Oswiu gave the Church 120 hides to found 10 monasteries after his victory over the heathen king Penda. Bestowal of land to the Church would have limited the amount of land that could be given to elites as a reward for service and loyalty. In the early stages of the establishment of Christianity, churchmen were typically not English in origin and did not have ties to local elites, whilst later on, even though more were English, they still would have likely come from other kingdoms. This lack of access of local elites to the king's resources is suggested by Bede to be the reason that in the 8th century, young nobles were forced to leave Northumbria in order to acquire land. Reluctance to adopt Christianity may also have been dud to its much stricter monopoly on religious practice, with only priests being able to perform certain rituals, in contrast to the Anglo-Saxon traditional religion, which seemed not to have such a strict division in roles. Heathen elites, in contrast, led large-scale religious events, with feasts believed to have been held at their halls. This participation would likely have strengthened their reputation in the community and was important for upholding their power.

Wives could also be significant influencing factors over whether a king would choose to adopt Christianity or not. Bede writes that the wife of Rædwald convinced him to continue worshipping traditional gods whilst Pope Boniface V sent a letter to Æþelburh of Kent urging her to persuade her husband Edwin of Northumbria to convert. Kate Cooper has argued that the depiction of wives having influence over the views of their husbands is a literary feature that does not reflect historical fact, however this is rejected by other scholars who argue that whilst this may be the case in some instances, it is likely to be based on reality. That queens had significant power in religious matters is attested more widely such as in the Life of St Wilfrid, in which Wilfrid goes to Queen Eanflæd for patronship, rather than her husband Oswiu. It has been proposed that this power of queens originated principally in their kinship ties with queens often being from other kingdoms to their husbands.

Furthermore, many early Christian kings were succeeded by sons who either were not baptised or returned to heathenry upon the deaths of their fathers. It has been argued that the balance between the two ideologies was highly fluid and the decision was closely intertwined with the power balance of local elites. Affirming adherence to the traditional religion could have been used to raise support from local elites, such as in the case of Essex where Christianity was imposed on the region by Kent, and after the death of Sæberht, his sons Sexræd and Sæward rejected Christianity and held to Anglo-Saxon paganism instead. This may have been seen as an act of asserting independence that would have appealed those who opposed the Kentish hegemony. Following this, it has been suggested that established kings may have been more likely to be baptised so as to gain access to the benefits of Christianity while those vying for kingship may have been more inclined towards keeping to the traditional religion. This may be why kings like Eadbald and Cenwalh may have adopted Christianity once secure in their rulership.

== Cultural effects ==
=== Adoption of Frankish, Roman and Christian customs ===
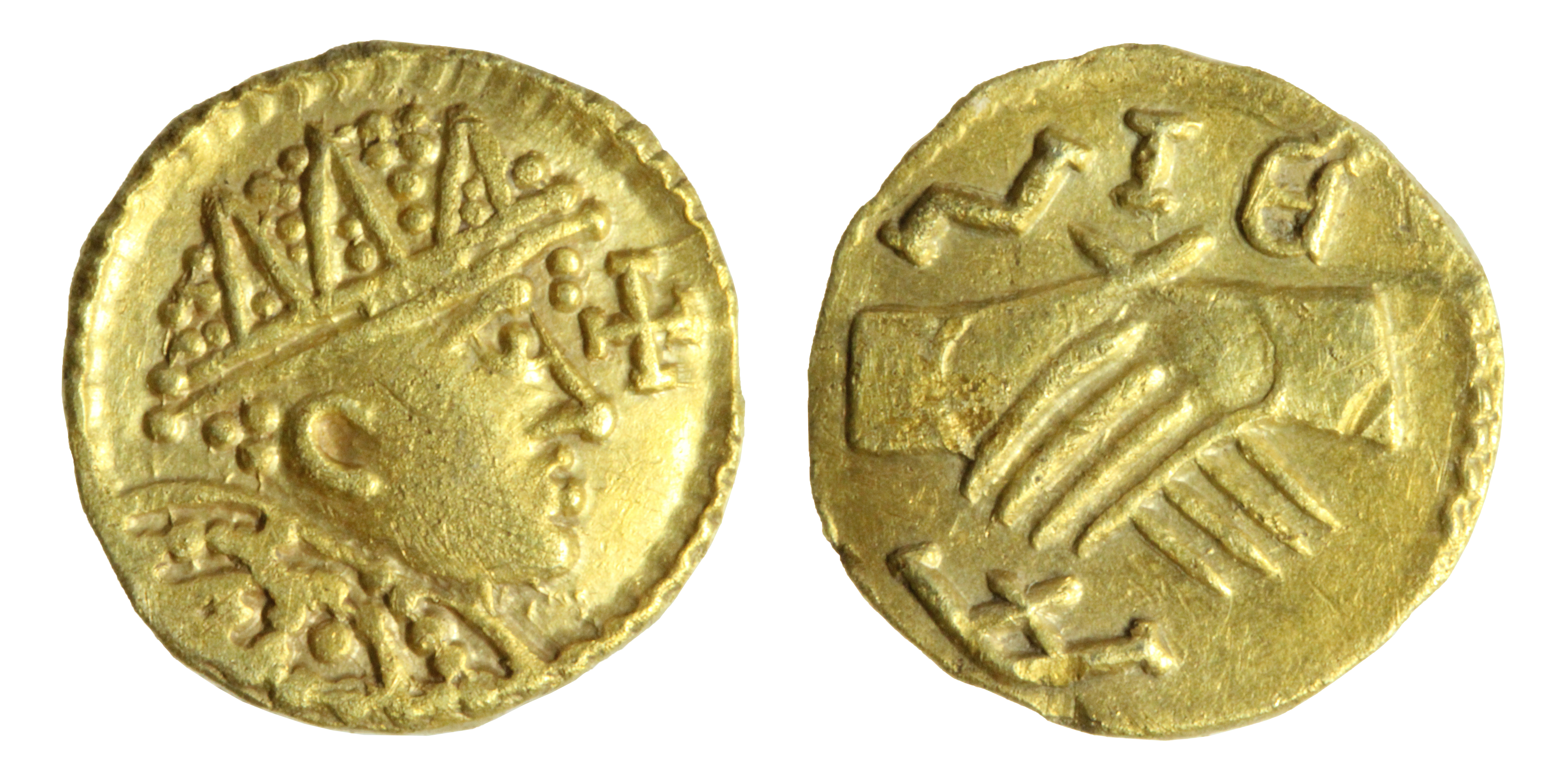
An early medieval Anglo-Saxon gold þrymsa coin from c. 650–675.

During the conversion period there was a shift away from Scandinavian influence and towards Frankish and Eastern Roman culture. This reorientation and increased southern influence with Christianity led to the revival of gold coins in the early 7th century, beginning in Kent, with large scale minting of silver coins seen from c. 675 onwards.

The adoption of Christianity by the elite can be seen in the archaeological record in the reduction of richly furnished burials, with them becoming rare by the late 7th century and almost none between 730 and the beginning of the Viking Age towards the end of the 8th century. Furnished graves also become scarce in lower status contexts between the late 7th and early 8th centuries, although it took until roughly the 10th century before most burials were taking place in churchyards. In the late 6th to early 8th centuries, some burials show influences of both heathen and Christian customs such as the Prittlewell royal Anglo-Saxon burial which contained items such as gold foil crosses, a drinking horn and a lyre. The body was further positioned facing the east in a Christian manner whilst also being placed beneath a large howe. It has been argued that trying to ascertain whether the man buried was a Christian or pagan is ultimately unproductive as this period was characterised by ideological experimentation and religious syncretism.

Written sources, such as Bede's letter to Ecgbert of York, draw attention to the low number of bishops and people taking regular communion despite tithes being taken. This sentiment is further attested in the 747 Council of Clovesho which stated that priests should have a correct understanding of the doctrine of the Trinity and teach this, along with the Creed. They also record deficiencies in training restricting the influence of Christianity with Bede describing Bishop John of York as noting that one priest was performing baptisms wrongly due to a lack of knowledge. Outside of royal nunneries, it has been suggested that Christianity was slow to enter into homes, where the power of women was greatest. Despite this, Christianity had become firmly established in the English kingdoms by 730 and although aspects of the pre-Christian culture remained, Christianity was the dominant intellectual paradigm.

=== Continuation and suppression of heathen practices ===
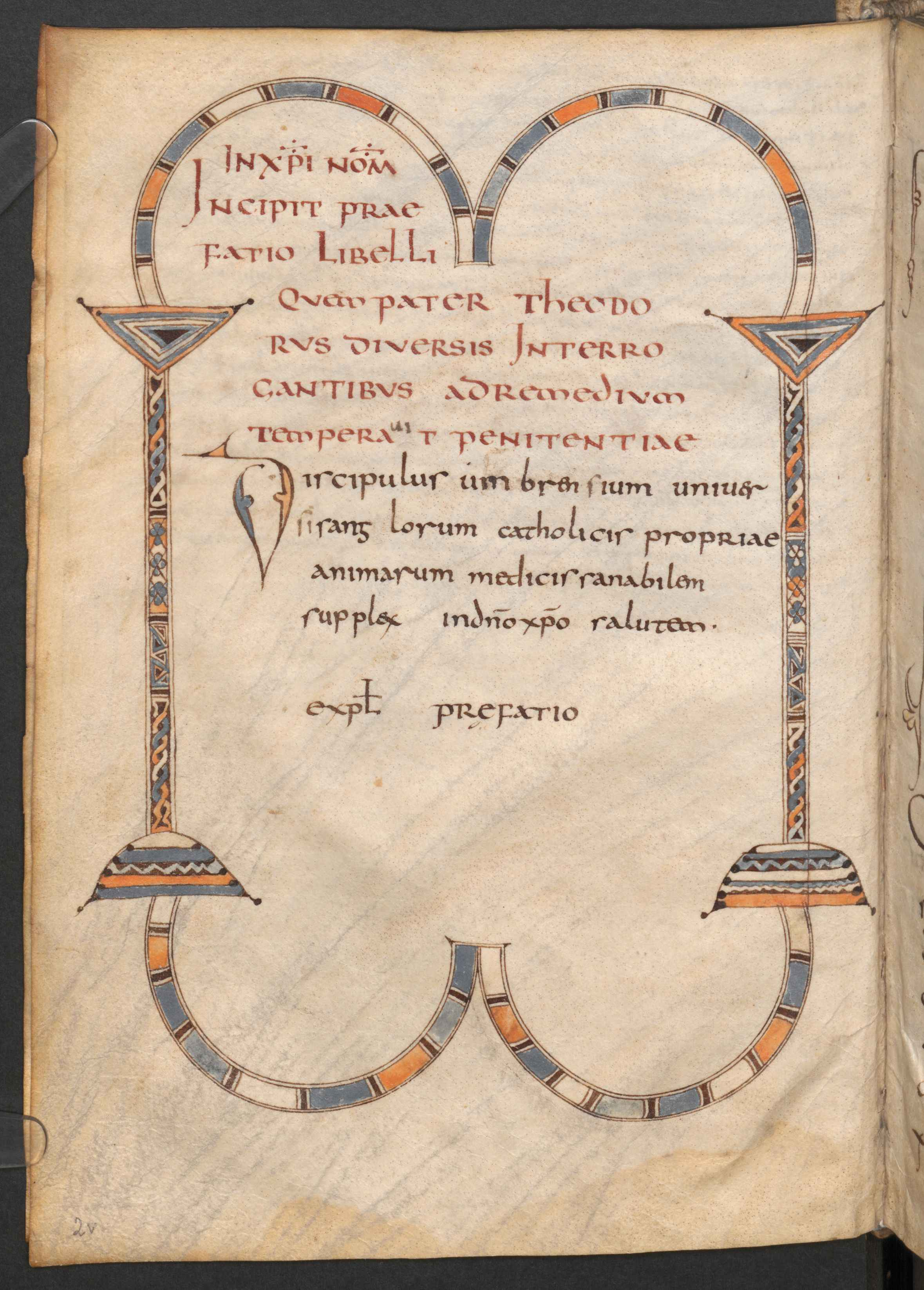
Folio 2v from the Vienna manuscript of the Penitential of Theodore, which lists a number of practices considered heathen as punishable offences.

Whilst Bede equates the baptism of a king with the complete adoption of Christianity by the whole ruled population, royal baptisms were only an important step in the process that could have taken generations. Accounts of apostasy of elites demonstrate that knowledge and respect for heathen traditions continued in some regions after baptism of the first king. Consistent with this, the early converts to Christianity Æthelburht, Edwin and Oswald appear to have allowed heathen rites to continue to be practised against the wishes of the clergymen, leading to Pope Gregory in 601 urging Æthelburht "hasten to extend the Christian faith among the people who are subject to you. Increase your righteous zeal for their conversion; suppress the worship of idols; overthrow their buildings and shrines". (Note: The original Latin is: "Christianam fidem in populis tibi subditis extendere festina; zelum rectitudinis tuae in eorumconuersione multiplica; idolorum cultus insequere; fanorum aedificia euerte".) According to Bede, Eorcenberht of Kent, who ruled from 640 to 664, was the first king to begin trying to eliminate heathen cult activities. This reluctance shown in the early stages of Christianisation has been argued to have resulted from the need to balance the demands of the Church, practicalities of placating local elites and maintenance of positive relationships with other kingdoms.

Active suppression of paganism in the wider population seems to only have begun in the late 7th century. From this point onwards, legal codes and penitentials often forbid practices considered heathen. In its section entitled "Of the Worship of Idols", the late 7th- or early 8th-century Penitential of Theodore assigns penance to those qui immolant demonibus ("who sacrifice to demons"), lasting between 1 and 10 years depending on the deemed severity of the offence. The term "demons" in this context would likely have referred to heathen gods and other beings connected to Anglo-Saxon pre-Christian religion, as these were typically equated in Christian thinking. The penitential further lists the appropriate punishment for practices such as the eating of food offered in sacrifices to the recipient being and the burning of cereals where a man has died to bring good health to the household. Similar prohibitions are seen throughout other law codes from a similar time such as those of King Wihtred of Kent, dating to around 695. The 8th-century Paenitentiale Pseudo-Ecgberhti lists punishments for those that act wrongly. For example, those who bring offerings to springs, stones or trees should fast on only bread and water for three years, whilst those that only eat there should fast for one year in the same manner.

Similar law codes are produced such as the early 11th-century law codes of Cnut and Canons of Edgar, written by Archbishop Wulfstan (died 1023) of York, which enforce observance of Christianity across the whole of England, including the baptism of newborns, paying of tithes, worship and love of one god and participation in housel. They further state that priests should strive to extinguish all heathen practices and forbid the worship of the traditional gods. Many laws specify punishments for those caught following heathen customs such as the Norðhymbra preosta lagu, dating to after 1027, which describes how those guilty of carrying out acts such as blót and "idol worship" are to pay a fine to the Church and to the king. In the case of the building of a friðgeard ("sanctuary"), the laws state that half the fine should go to Christ (likely meaning the Church) and the other to the landowner where the friðgeard was made, suggesting they were secret places, typically attended by those of low social standing. Wulfstan's the Peace of Edward and Guthrum similarly prescribes wergild or a fine proportional to the severity of the crime for those who honour heathenship, whilst the II Cnut law code states that apostates should be exiled or executed. Furthermore, the VII Æthelred law code dated to around 1009 instructs that all religious foundations should sing masses daily named "contra paganos" ("Against the pagans").

These writings frequently list forbidden practices, possibly allowing inference of what may have been taking place, such as the veneration of the sun and moon, and the "nonsense" practised at elder trees, in friðsplottum ("sanctuaries") and at stones. Whilst it is difficult to discern which of these existed in Britain before the migrations of heathen Scandinavians in the 9th centuries and onwards, and which were brought by them, there does not seem to be a significant difference between the practices condemned in Northumbria and the more southern parts of England, where Scandinavian influence was less extensive. Furthermore, there is agreement between Wulfstan's writings and the 8th-century Paenitentiale Pseudo-Ecgberhti on matters such as forbidding the bringing offerings to trees, springs and stones, which Wulfstan records aims for good health of themselves or their livestock.

So many early medieval churches are found nearby to prehistoric monuments that it is unlikely to be coincidental. The variety of contexts, however, has been used to argue that they are not all due to the single explanation of the churches being built to Christianise a heathen holy place. Alternative reasons may be due to the sites also being settled and their use as fortifications. Written sources tend to focus on the active use of Roman ruins rather than pre-Christian monuments such as howes or ditches. One possible example of it however is in Guthlac A, where the author may have intentionally depicted the demon-haunted howe into which the saint ventures as resembling a heathen holy place, making the narrative one in which a place of heathen worship is made into a Christian one. A similar changing of association is likely also attested in the marking of a cross on the prehistoric standing stone at Rudston, which a church was built next to. It has been further proposed that in an attempt to replace heathen beliefs, tales were spread that described the miracles of saints and their power both to heal, and over nature and harvests, such as those from Lives of Cuthbert and Dialogues.

=== Blending of heathen and Christian cultural elements ===
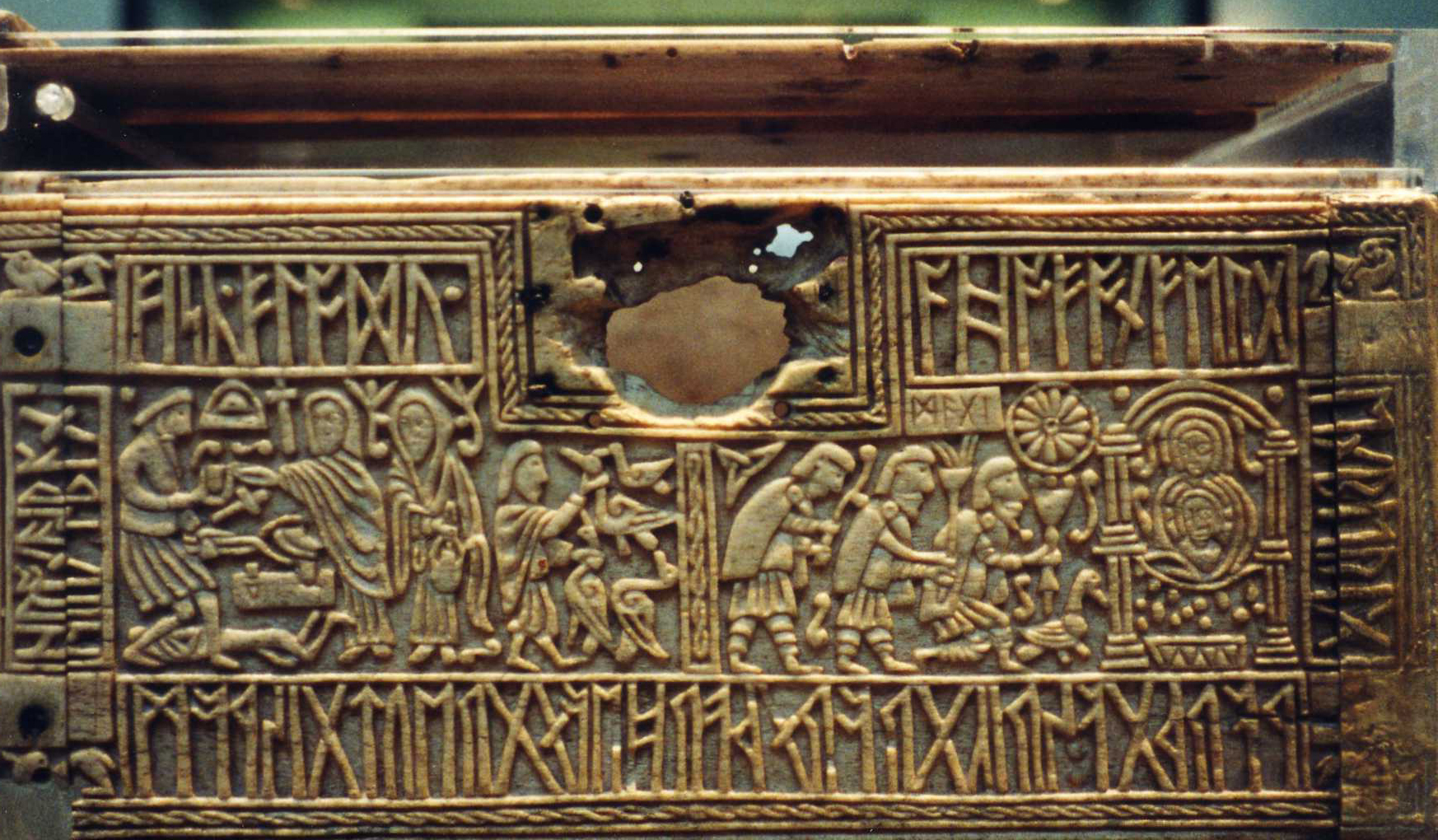
The Franks Casket, depicting the Germanic tale of Wayland (left) alongside the Christian Adoration of the Magi (right).

Several modern English religious words still used in Christianity derive from Old English and are cognate with terms in other Germanic languages such as Old Norse, having roots in Proto-Germanic and predating the introduction of Christianity to England. These include words such as god, holy, bless, heaven and hell (cognate with Old Norse: Hel). Furthermore, the term Yule originally referred to a Germanic heathen winter festival that was incorporated into the celebration of Christmas and Easter likely derives its name from the name of the god Eostre. Old English writings also represent Jesus in the framework of the Anglo-Saxon elite, using terms for him such as hlaford ("lord") and describing his disciples as þegns. The Anglo-Saxon royal genealogies further trace the descent of the kings to gods such as Woden and Seaxneat, with in some cases the ancestry being extended back to Biblical figures such as Noah.

Similarly, Old English literature attests to the combination and adaptation of Christian imagery and Germanic heroic traditions originating in the pre-Christian religion. Beowulf, for example, has been argued to be the result of Christian attempts to reinterpret the old lore in the light of the new theology. This is seen in their description of ettins (such as Grendel) and elves as kindred of Cain, harmonising Germanic folklore and Biblical mythology. Similarly, this combination of cultural elements is also seen in The Dream of the Rood when Jesus actively mounts the cross himself, in contrast to the typical Christian focus on humility and submission to death. The popularity of tales originating in the pre-Christian culture is attested by a letter sent in 797 by Alcuin to Hygebald, the bishop of Lindisfarne, in which he asks "Quid enim Hinieldus cum Christo?" ("What has Ingeld to do with Christ?"), in criticism of the monks' fondness of listening in the refectory to Germanic legends, which he described as pagan, instead of focusing on spiritual wisdom.

Charms such as Æcerbot show blending of heathen cultural elements into a Christian ritual context that have been suggested to be as much a "folklorisation" of Christianity as a Christianisation of folklore. Furthermore, other charms focus on defending against beings from Germanic folklore such as elves, dwarfs and ēse. This is also seen in material finds such as the Near Fakenham plaque which was likely made to cause the death of a dwarf that was either causing, or equated with, an illness and forms part of a wider cultural practice also reflected in the Ribe skull fragment. Often explicitly Christian figures are invoked for help, such as in the Ƿið dƿeorh charms. One of these invokes the names of saints while another requires the writing of the names of the Seven Sleepers of Ephesus on Communion wafers, the hanging of them around a virgin's neck and the reciting of a galdor that describes the dwarf's sister making it swear oaths to not harm the afflicted person again. Christian figures are not exclusively relied on, however, with the Canterbury charm from a manuscript dated to around 1073 invoking the god Þórr for healing an illness caused by a þyrs, similar to the Sigtuna and Kvinneby amulets from Sweden.

Some themes in British ballads and other popular culture have been argued to derive from pre-Christian sources, though there are many uncertainties in their influences due to dynamic elements and continued close contacts with Germanic-speaking cultures across the North Sea and multiple possible cultures of origin. One such example is the early 16th-century English chapbook Mary of Nemmegen, in which the devil appears to a woman in the form of a man with only one eye as he must always have a physical fault, resembling Óðinn who is identified with the devil in several North-Germanic sources. It has been suggested this motif was present in other Germanic-speaking areas as the source of the text was Dutch. Similar motifs proposed to derive from tales of Óðinn include one of the Child Ballads in which the devil engages in a wisdom contest with a young girl, threatening to make her his lover if she cannot answer them. In some cases, names of beings in ballads and folklore more widely derive from those from Anglo-Saxon and Nordic paganism such as Hind Etin (from Old English: eoten or Old Norse: jǫtunn), who abducts a woman and is not Christian, in line with some depictions of jǫtnar in North-Germanic sources. Elves similarly are ultimately derived from Germanic paganism though how they were understood has changed significantly over time and it is unclear if their roles in ballads align well with how they were conceived of in pre-Christian religions.

=== Importance of English missionaries ===
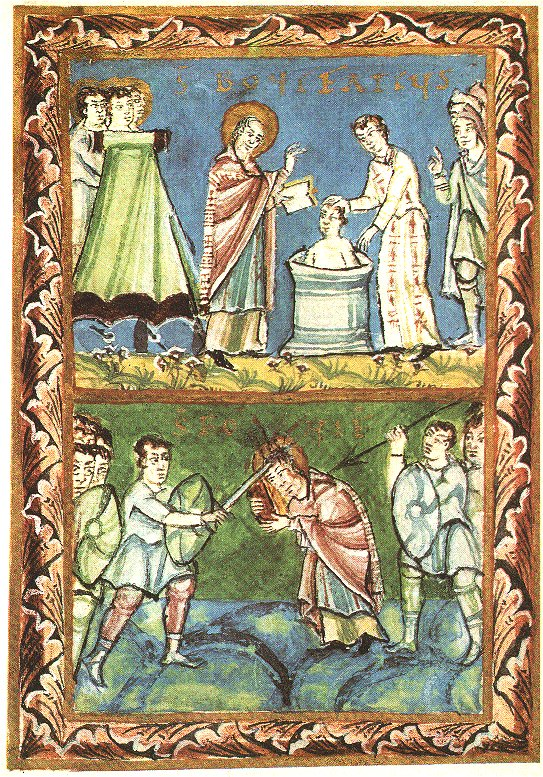
The English St Boniface baptising (top) and being martyred (bottom) as depicted on the Fulda Sacramentary

After the establishment of the Church in England, many English missionaries became instrumental in the adoption of Christianity amongst other peoples in Northern Europe such as the Saxons and Scandinavians. Saint Boniface also spent 6 years in Frisia in the early 8th century in an ultimately unsuccessful mission.

In particular, after the failed German missions in the 9th century, the Christianisation of Denmark, Norway and Sweden during the late 10th and 11th centuries was dominated by Englishmen. Notably, Hákon góði, the son of Haraldr hárfagri, was also fostered by Æðelstān around 930, leading to him later being referred to as Aðalsteinsfóstri ("Æðelstān's foster-son"). According to later sagas such as Hákonar saga góðá, he later returned to Norway and became the first king there to encourage the adoption of Christianity in the region, inviting a bishop and priests from England to help him. The reliability of these sources is unclear, given that they are not contemporary to Hákon and that the poem composed in his praise shortly after his death, Hákonarmál, refers to him still as heathen. Further English missionaries in Norway, such as those in the company of Olaf Tryggvason and Olaf Haraldsson are recorded by accounts such as that written by Adam of Bremen and sagas.

Bede writes that English missionaries were inspired to convert the continental Saxons by their shared ancestry and it has been suggested that the missionaries to Scandinavia may also have been motivated by this reason. The ability for English bishops and priests to perform missionary work in Scandinavia was also facilitated by the extensive political interactions between the regions that were occurring at the time, such as the formation of the North Sea Empire under Cnut.

== See also ==
- Christianity in Anglo-Saxon England
- Christianisation of the Germanic peoples
- Religion in the United Kingdom

== Bibliography ==
=== Primary ===
- Bede: Book IV.
- The Anglo-Saxon Chronicle. Translated by Ingram, James.
- Ancient Laws and Institutes of England: Comprising Laws Enacted Under the Anglo-Saxon Kings from Æthelbirht to Cnut, with an English Translation of the Saxon; the Laws Called Edward the Confessor's; the Laws of William the Conqueror, and Those Ascribed to Henry the First. G. E. Eyre and A. Spottiswoode, printers to the Queen's Most Excellent Majesty. 1840.
- Sellar (1907). Bede's Ecclesiastical History of England - Christian Classics Ethereal Library. London: George Bell and Sons.
- Stephanus, Eddius (1985). The life of Bishop Wilfrid. Cambridge [Cambridgeshire]; New York : Cambridge University Press. ISBN 978-0-521-30927-1.
- Thorpe, Benjamin (2012). "Law of the Northumbrian priests". Ancient Laws and Institutes of England. Cambridge University Press. pp. 290–303. ISBN 9781139177412.
- "Early English Laws". www.earlyenglishlaws.ac.uk.

=== Secondary ===
- Abels, Richard (January 2009). "What Has Weland to Do with Christ? The Franks Casket and the Acculturation of Christianity in Early Anglo-Saxon England". Speculum. 84 (3): 549–581. doi:10.1017/S0038713400209305. ISSN 0038-7134.
- Abram, Christopher (20 December 2019). "At home in the fens with the Grendelkin". Dating Beowulf. Manchester University Press. pp. 120–144. ISBN 978-1-5261-3644-2.
- Abrams, Lesley (1995). "The Anglo-Saxons and the Christianization of Scandinavia". Anglo-Saxon England. 24: 213–249. doi:10.1017/S0263675100004701. ISSN 0263-6751. JSTOR 44510026.
- Abrams, Lesley (2016). "The conversion of the Danelaw". Vikings and the Danelaw: Select Papers from the Proceedings of the Thirteenth Viking Congress, Nottingham and York, 21-30 August 1997 (reprint ed.). Havertown Oxford: Oxbow Books. pp. 31–44. ISBN 9781785704536. JSTOR j.ctt1kw29nj.7.
- Abrams, Lesley (2000). "Conversion and Assimilation". Cultures in contact: Scandinavian settlement in England in the ninth and tenth centuries. Turnhout, Belgium: Brepols. ISBN 2503509789.
- Bennett, Ellora (2021). "The construction of the enemy in pre-Viking England". Early medieval militarisation. Manchester University Press. ISBN 9781526138637.
- Biddle, Martin; Kjølbye-Biddle, Birthe (2016). "Repton and the 'great heathen army', 873–4". Vikings and the Danelaw: Select Papers from the Proceedings of the Thirteenth Viking Congress, Nottingham and York, 21-30 August 1997 (reprint ed.). Havertown Oxford: Oxbow Books. ISBN 9781785704536. JSTOR j.ctt1kw29nj.8.
- Brooks, Nicholas (1984). The Early History of the Church of Canterbury: Christ Church from 597 to 1066. London: Leicester University Press. ISBN 978-0-7185-0041-2.
- Campbell, James; John, Eric; Wormald, Patrick (1991). The Anglo-Saxons. London, England; New York, N.Y., USA: Penguin Books. ISBN 978-0-14-014395-9.
- Chaney, William A. (1960). "Paganism to Christianity in Anglo-Saxon England". The Harvard Theological Review. 53 (3): 197–217. doi:10.1017/S0017816000027012. ISSN 0017-8160. JSTOR 1508400.
- Chaney, William A. (1970). The Cult of Kingship in Anglo-Saxon England: The Transition from Paganism to Christianity. University of California Press. ISBN 978-0-520-01401-5.
- Cherniss, Michael D. (2018). Ingeld and Christ: Heroic Concepts and Values in Old English Christian Poetry. Walter de Gruyter GmbH & Co KG. ISBN 978-3-11-086641-4.
- Church, S. D. (April 2008). "Paganism in Conversion-Age Anglo-Saxon England: The Evidence of Bede's Ecclesiastical History Reconsidered". History. 93 (310): 162–180. doi:10.1111/j.1468-229X.2008.00420.x.
- Cool, Hilary (1 November 2015). "The Staffordshire Hoard (2016)". Historic England Research News.
- Costambeys, Marios (23 September 2004). "Erik Bloodaxe [Eiríkr Blóðöx, Eiríkr Haraldsson]". Oxford Dictionary of National Biography (online ed.). Oxford University Press. doi:10.1093/ref:odnb/49265. (Subscription, Wikipedia Library access or UK public library membership required.) (Subscription or UK public library membership required)
- Dunn, Marilyn (2010). The Christianization of the Anglo-Saxons c. 597 - c. 700: discourses of life, death and afterlife. London: Continuum. ISBN 9781441110138.
- Fletcher, Richard. A. (1998). The Barbarian Conversion: From Paganism to Christianity. New York: H. Holt and Co. ISBN 978-0-8050-2763-1.
- Frend, William H.C. (2003). "Roman Britain, a Failed Promise". The Cross Goes North: Processes of Conversion in Northern Europe, AD 300–1300. Woodbridge, Suffolk, UK : Rochester, NY: York Medieval Press; Boydell & Brewer. pp. 79–92. doi:10.2307/j.ctv136bvsn. ISBN 1903153115. JSTOR j.ctv136bvsn.9.
- Graham-Campbell, James (2016). "Pagan Scandinavian burial in the central and southern Danelaw". Vikings and the Danelaw: Select Papers from the Proceedings of the Thirteenth Viking Congress, Nottingham and York, 21-30 August 1997 (reprint ed.). Havertown Oxford: Oxbow Books. pp. 105–138. ISBN 9781785704536. JSTOR j.ctt1kw29nj.10.
- Gretzinger, Joscha; Sayer, Duncan; Justeau, Pierre; Altena, Eveline; Pala, Maria; et al. (October 2022). "The Anglo-Saxon migration and the formation of the early English gene pool". Nature. 610 (7930): 112–119. Bibcode:2022Natur.610..112G. doi:10.1038/s41586-022-05247-2. ISSN 1476-4687. PMC 9534755. PMID 36131019.
- Goffart, Walter (2012). The Narrators of Barbarian History(ad 550-800). Notre Dame: University of Notre Dame. ISBN 978-0-268-02967-8.
- Gunnell, Terry (2015). "Pantheon? What Pantheon? Concepts of a Family of Gods in Pre-Christian Scandinavian Religions". Scripta Islandica: Isländska sällskapets årsbok. 66. Isländska sällskapet: 55–76.
- Hadley, Dawn M. (2000). "'Hamlet and the Princes of Denmark': Lordship in the Danelaw, c. 860-954". Cultures in contact: Scandinavian settlement in England in the ninth and tenth centuries. Turnhout, Belgium: Brepols. ISBN 2503509789.
- Hall, Alaric (2007). Elves in Anglo-Saxon England: matters of belief, health, gender and identity. Woodbridge, Suffolk, UK: Boydell Press. ISBN 978-1843835097.
- Hall, Alaric (22 June 2007). "Images of Medieval Sanctity: Essays in Honour of Gary Dickson". Images of Medieval Sanctity. Brill. pp. 207–235. ISBN 978-90-474-2068-2.
- Hall, Alaric (2009). ""Þur sarriþu þursa trutin": Monster-Fighting and Medicine in Early Medieval Scandinavia". Asclepio. 61 (1): 195–218. doi:10.3989/asclepio.2009.v61.i1.278. PMID 19753693.
- Hamilton, Marie Padgett (1946). "The Religious Principle in Beowulf". PMLA. 61 (2): 309–330. doi:10.1632/459354.
- Herrin, Judith (2021). The formation of Christendom. Princeton (N.J.) Oxford: Princeton University Press. doi:10.1515/9780691220772. ISBN 978-0-691-22077-2.
- Higgins, John Seville (December 1933). "The Ultramontanism of Saint Boniface". Church History. 2 (4): 197–210. doi:10.1017/S0009640700120566. ISSN 1755-2613.
- Higham, Nicholas John (1997). The Convert Kings: Power and Religious Affiliation in Early Anglo-Saxon England. Manchester, UK: Manchester University Press. ISBN 978-0-7190-4827-2.
- Higham, Nicholas John; Ryan, Martin J. (2013). The Anglo-Saxon world. New Haven: Yale University Press. ISBN 9780300125344.
- Hindley, Geoffrey (2006). A Brief History of the Anglo-Saxons: The Beginnings of the English Nation. New York: Carroll & Graf Publishers. ISBN 978-0-7867-1738-5.
- Hines, John (2017). "A glimpse of the heathen Norse in Lincolnshire". Crossing boundaries: interdisciplinary approaches to the art, material culture, language and literature of the early medieval world: essays presented to Professor Emeritus Richard N. Bailey, OBE, on the occasion of his eightieth birthday. Oxbow Books. ISBN 978-1-78570-310-2. JSTOR j.ctt1s47569.
- Hines, John (2019). "Anglo-Saxon Micro-Texts - Practical Runic Literacy in the Late Anglo-Saxon Period: Inscriptions on Lead Sheet". Anglia Book Series. 63 (1): 29–59. doi:10.1515/9783110630961-003. S2CID 165389048.
- Jesch, Judith (2020). "Further Thoughts on E18 Saltfleetby". Futhark: International Journal of Runic Studies. 9–10: 201–213. doi:10.33063/diva-401054.
- Jolly, Karen Louise (1996). Popular religion in late Saxon England: elf charms in context. Chapel Hill: University of North Carolina Press. ISBN 0807822620.
- Kelly, S. E. (23 September 2004). "Eadbald (d. 640), king of Kent". Oxford Dictionary of National Biography (online ed.). Oxford University Press. doi:10.1093/ref:odnb/8375. (Subscription, Wikipedia Library access or UK public library membership required.) https://doi.org/(Subscription or UK public library membership required)
- Kelly, S. E. (23 September 2004). "Kings of the South Saxons". Oxford Dictionary of National Biography (online ed.). Oxford University Press. doi:10.1093/ref:odnb/52344. (Subscription, Wikipedia Library access or UK public library membership required.) https://doi.org/(Subscription or UK public library membership required)
- Kirby, David Peter (2000). The earliest English kings (Rev. ed.). London; New York: Routledge. ISBN 9780415242110.
- Kirby, D.P. (1978). "The Church in Saxon Sussex". In Brandon, Peter (ed.). The South Saxons. Chichester: Phillimore. ISBN 0-85033-240-0.
- Lund, Julie (2010). "Chapter 3, At the Water's Edge". Signals of Belief in Early England: Anglo-Saxon Paganism Revisited. Oxbow Books. ISBN 978-1-84217-395-4. JSTOR j.ctt1cd0nf9.9.
- Markus, R. A. (April 1963). "The Chronology of the Gregorian Mission to England: Bede's Narrative and Gregory's Correspondence". The Journal of Ecclesiastical History. 14 (1): 16–30. doi:10.1017/S0022046900064356.
- Markus, R. A. (1997). Gregory the Great and his world. Cambridge; New York: Cambridge University Press. ISBN 9780521586085.
- Mayr-Harting, Henry (1991). The Coming of Christianity to Anglo-Saxon England (3rd ed.). University Park, PA: Pennsylvania State University Press. ISBN 978-0-271-00769-4.
- Mayr-Harting, Henry (23 September 2004). "Augustine [St Augustine] (d. 604), missionary and archbishop of Canterbury". Oxford Dictionary of National Biography (online ed.). Oxford University Press. doi:10.1093/ref:odnb/899. (Subscription, Wikipedia Library access or UK public library membership required.) (Subscription or UK public library membership required)
- McKinnell, John (2021). "Pre-Christian Traces in British Ballads and Other Popular Poetry". Folklore and Old Norse mythology. Helsinki: The Kalevala Society. ISBN 978-952-9534-02-9.
- Meaney, Audrey L. (January 2004). "'And we forbeodað eornostlice ælcne hæðenscipe': Wulfstan and Late Anglo-Saxon and Norse 'Heathenism'". Wulfstan, Archbishop of York. Studies in the Early Middle Ages. 10. Brepols Publishers: 461–500. doi:10.1484/m.sem-eb.3.3720. ISBN 978-2-503-52224-1.
- Nelson, Janet L. (23 September 2004). "Bertha, queen in Kent, consort of Æthelberht". Oxford Dictionary of National Biography (online ed.). Oxford University Press. doi:10.1093/ref:odnb/2269. (Subscription, Wikipedia Library access or UK public library membership required.) (Subscription or UK public library membership required)
- O’Brien, Conor (30 December 2017). "Kings and Kingship in the Writings of Bede". The English Historical Review. 132 (559): 1473–1498. doi:10.1093/ehr/cex370.
- Orme, Nicholas (2006). Medieval Schools: From Roman Britain to Renaissance England. New Haven, Connecticut; London: Yale University Press. ISBN 978-03001-1-102-6.
- Petts, David (2003). Christianity in Roman Britain (1. publ ed.). Stroud: Tempus. ISBN 0-7524-2540-4.
- Pluskowski, Aleks (2011). "The Archaeology of Paganism". In Helena Hamerow; David A. Hinton; Sally Crawford (eds.). The Oxford Handbook of Anglo-Saxon Archaeology. Oxford: Oxford University Press. pp. 764–778. ISBN 978-0199212149.
- Pryce, Huw (2009). "Conversions to Christianity". In Stafford, Pauline (ed.). A companion to the early Middle Ages. Blackwell Publishing Ltd. pp. 143–159. ISBN 978-1-4051-0628-3.
- Richards, Julian D. (2016). "Boundaries and cult centres: Viking burial in Derbyshire". Vikings and the Danelaw: Select Papers from the Proceedings of the Thirteenth Viking Congress, Nottingham and York, 21-30 August 1997 (reprint ed.). Havertown Oxford: Oxbow Books. pp. 97–104. ISBN 9781785704536. JSTOR j.ctt1kw29nj.9.
- Sanmark, Alexandra (2004). Power and Conversion. A Comparative Study of Christianization in Scandinavia. The University of Uppsala.
- Semple, Sarah (2013). Perceptions of the Prehistoric in Anglo-Saxon England: Religion, Ritual, and Rulership in the Landscape. Oxford: Oxford University Press. ISBN 9780199683109.
- Shapland, Michael (2023). Kaminski, Jamie (ed.). "Selsey Cathedral and the Early Medieval Kingdoms of Sussex". Sussex Archaeological Collections. 161. Lewes: Sussex Archaeological Society.
- Sharpe, R. (1 September 2002). "The Naming of Bishop Ithamar". The English Historical Review. 117 (473): 889–894. doi:10.1093/ehr/117.473.889. ISSN 0013-8266.
- Simek, Rudolf (2008). A Dictionary of Northern Mythology. Translated by Hall, Angela. BOYE6. ISBN 9780859915137.
- Sisam, Kenneth (1954). Anglo-Saxon Royal Genealogies. British Academy.
- Stenton, Frank Merry (1971). Anglo-Saxon England. Oxford: Clarendon Press. ISBN 978-0-19-821716-9.
- Thacker, Alan (23 September 2004). "Deusdedit [St Deusdedit, Frithona]". Oxford Dictionary of National Biography (online ed.). Oxford University Press. doi:10.1093/ref:odnb/7560. (Subscription, Wikipedia Library access or UK public library membership required.) (Subscription or UK public library membership required)
- Thun, Nils (January 1969). "The malignant elves: Notes on Anglo-Saxon Magic and Germanic Myth". Studia Neophilologica. 41 (2): 378–396. doi:10.1080/00393276908587447.
- Tinti, Francesca (2021). Europe and the Anglo-Saxons. Cambridge New York, NY Port Melbourne, VIC New Delhi Singapore: Cambridge University Press. doi:10.1017/9781108942898. ISBN 9781108942898.
- Tyler, Damian (April 2007). "Reluctant Kings and Christian Conversion in Seventh-Century England". History. 92 (306): 144–161. doi:10.1111/j.1468-229X.2007.00389.x. ISSN 0018-2648.
- Welch, Martin (1978). "Early Anglo-Saxon Sussex". In Brandon, Peter (ed.). The South Saxons. Chichester: Phillimore. ISBN 0-85033-240-0.
- William Lloyd, James (1 October 2020). "The West Country Adventures of Saint Augustine of Canterbury". Folklore. 131 (4): 413–434. doi:10.1080/0015587X.2020.1721844. ISSN 0015-587X.
- Wood, Ian (January 1994). "The Mission of Augustine of Canterbury to the English". Speculum. 69 (1): 1–17. doi:10.2307/2864782. JSTOR 2864782. S2CID 161652367.
- Wormald, Patrick (23 September 2004). "Ine [Ini] (d. in or after 726)". Oxford Dictionary of National Biography (online ed.). Oxford University Press. doi:10.1093/ref:odnb/14380. (Subscription, Wikipedia Library access or UK public library membership required.) (Subscription or UK public library membership required)
- Yorke, Barbara (1985). "The kingdom of the East Saxons". Anglo-Saxon England. 14: 1–36. doi:10.1017/S0263675100001253. ISSN 0263-6751. JSTOR 44509858.
- Yorke, Barbara (1990). Kings and Kingdoms of Early Anglo-Saxon England. London: Seaby. doi:10.4324/9780203447307. ISBN 978-1-85264-027-9.
- Yorke, Barbara (2003). "The Adaptation of the Anglo-Saxon Royal Courts to Christianity". The cross goes north: processes of conversion in northern Europe, AD 300-1300. Woodbridge, Suffolk, UK : Rochester, NY: York Medieval Press; Boydell & Brewer. doi:10.2307/j.ctv136bvsn.19. ISBN 1903153115.
- Yorke, Barbara (23 September 2004). "Cynegils (d. 642)". Oxford Dictionary of National Biography (online ed.). Oxford University Press. doi:10.1093/ref:odnb/6988. (Subscription, Wikipedia Library access or UK public library membership required.) (Subscription or UK public library membership required)
- Yorke, Barbara (23 September 2004). "Cwichelm (d. 636)". Oxford Dictionary of National Biography (online ed.). Oxford University Press. doi:10.1093/ref:odnb/6986. (Subscription, Wikipedia Library access or UK public library membership required.) (Subscription or UK public library membership required)
- Yorke, Barbara (23 September 2004). "Cenwalh (d. 672)". Oxford Dictionary of National Biography (online ed.). Oxford University Press. doi:10.1093/ref:odnb/4996. (Subscription, Wikipedia Library access or UK public library membership required.) (Subscription or UK public library membership required)
- Yorke, Barbara (2006). The Conversion of Britain: Religion, Politics and Society in Britain c. 600–800. Pearson Longman. ISBN 978-0-582-77292-2.
- "bless". OED.
- "Easter". OED.
- "god". OED.
- "heaven". OED.
- "hell". OED.
- "holy". OED.
- "yule". OED.
