= Æscwine =

Anglo-Saxon name

Aescwine or Escwine or Æscwine is an Anglo-Saxon name, whose modern descendant is Ashwin. It translates literally as "ash-tree friend", but can mean a number of things, including "strong/manly friend", or "friendly man."

Notable persons with the name include:

- Æscwine of Essex (494-587), king of Essex
- Æscwine of Wessex (died c. 676), king of Wessex
