= Essex =

County of England

- Non-metropolitan and ceremonial county
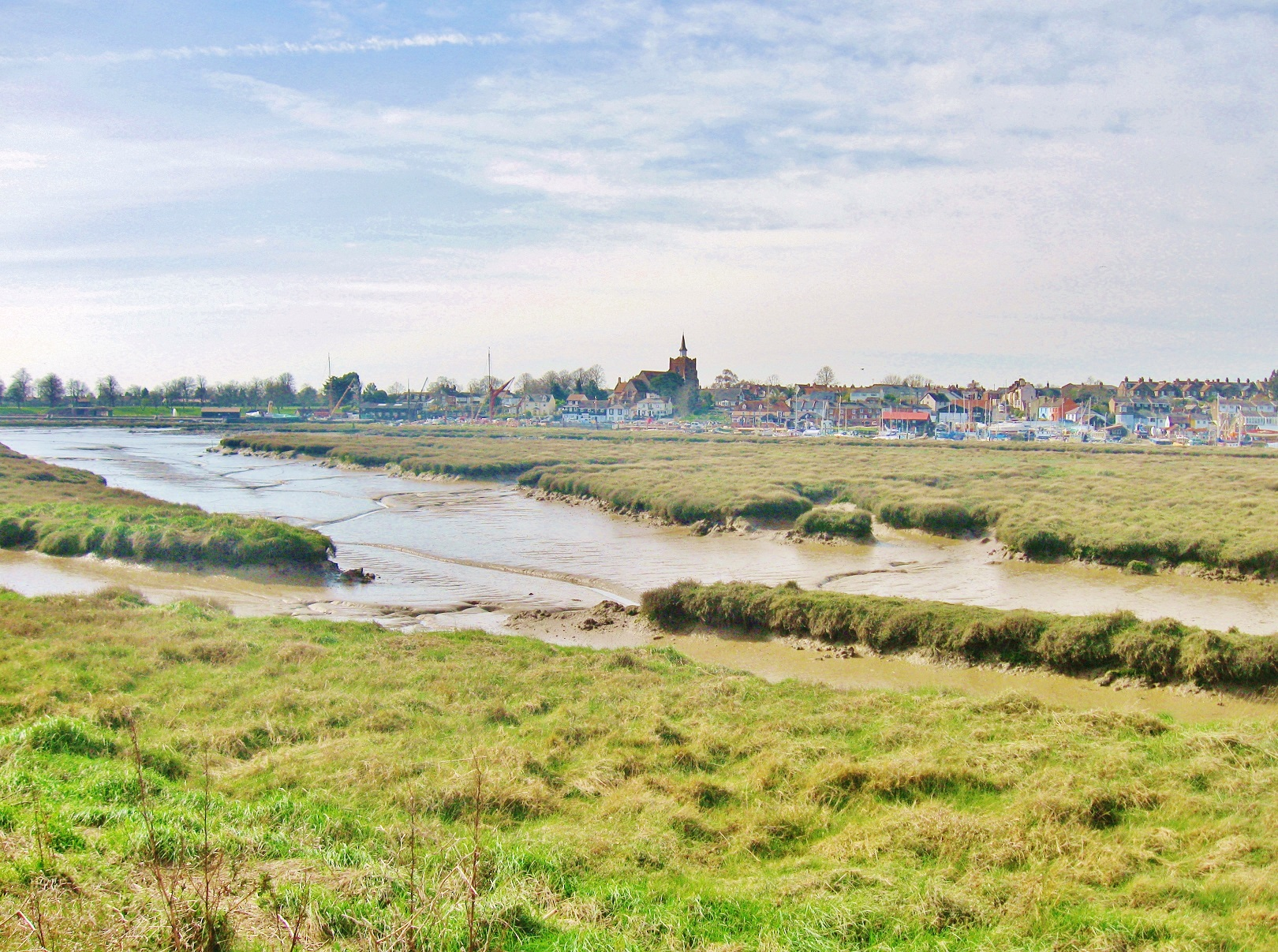
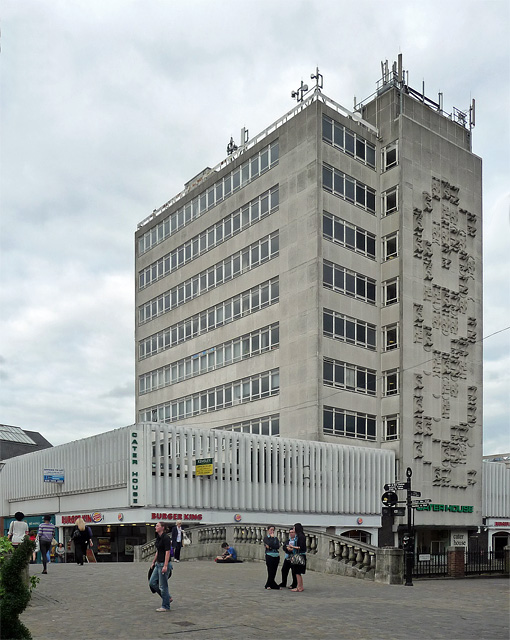
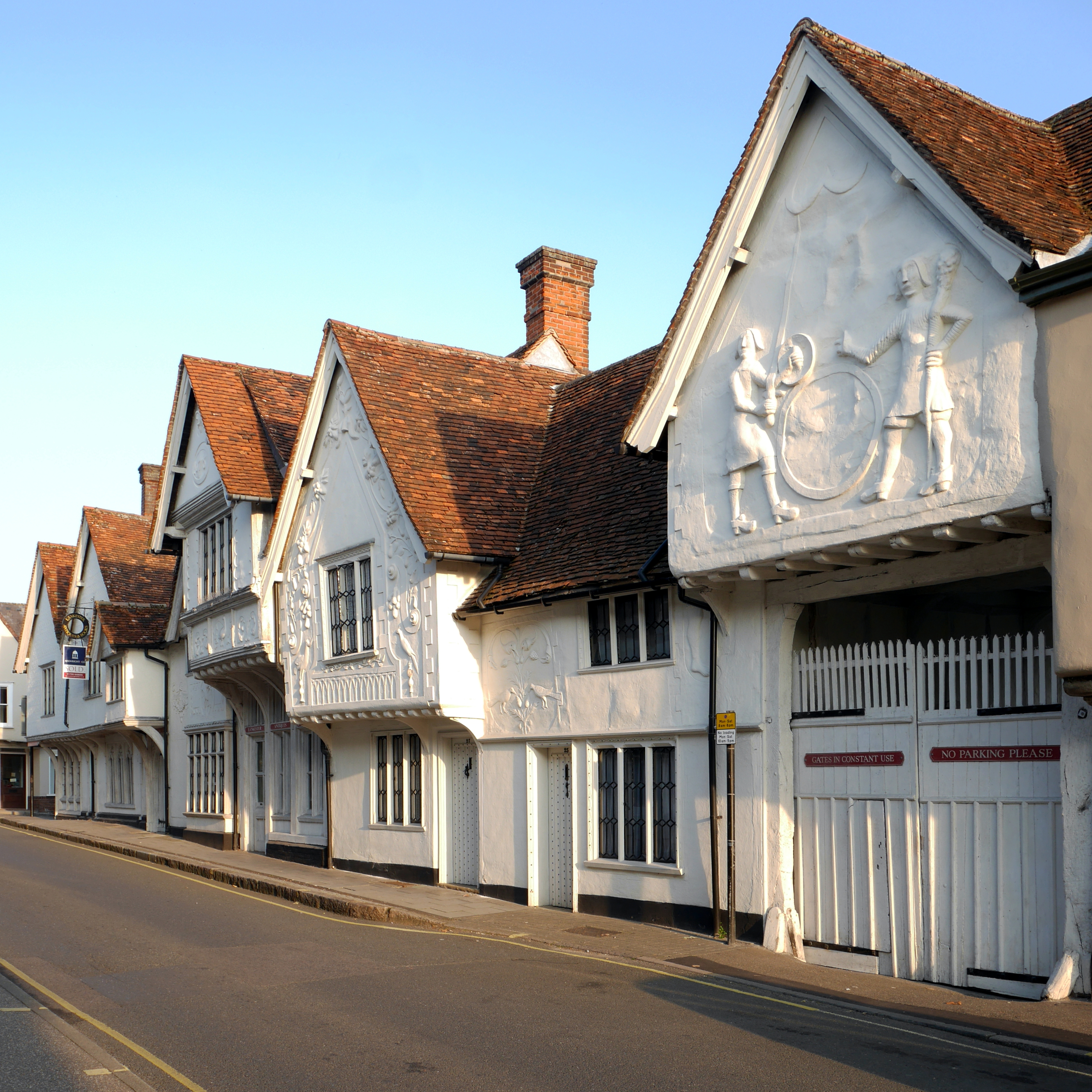
- Upper: the Hythe, Maldon Lower: Canside in Chelmsford (left); and the former Sun Inn, Saffron Walden, displaying pargeting (right)

- Ceremonial Essex within England
- Coordinates: 51°45′N 0°35′E
- Sovereign state: United Kingdom
- Constituent country: England
- Region: East of England
- Established: Ancient
- Time zone: UTC+0 (GMT)
  - Summer (DST): UTC+1 (BST)
- UK Parliament: 18 Members of Parliament: Con: 10; Lab: 5; Reform: 1; Lib Dem: 1; Ind: 1
- Police: Essex Police
- County town: Chelmsford
- Largest city: Southend-on-Sea
- Ceremonial county
- Lord Lieutenant: Jennifer Tolhurst
- High Sheriff: Susannah Dutton
- Area: 3,664 km^{2} (1,415 sq mi)
  - Rank: 11th of 48
- Population (2024): 1,929,610
  - Rank: 6th of 48
  - Density: 527/km^{2} (1,360/sq mi)
- Non-metropolitan county
- County council: Essex County Council
- Control: Reform UK
- Admin HQ: Chelmsford
- Area: 3,458 km^{2} (1,335 sq mi)
  - Rank: 7th of 21
- Population (2025): 1,576,125
  - Rank: 2nd of 21
  - Density: 456/km^{2} (1,180/sq mi)
- ISO 3166-2: GB-ESS
- GSS code: E10000012
- ITL: UKH33
- Website: essex.gov.uk
- Unitary authorities
- Councils: Southend-on-Sea City Council; Thurrock Council
- Districts
- Districts of Essex; Unitary County council area
- Districts: List: Uttlesford; Braintree; Colchester; Tendring; Harlow; Epping Forest; Chelmsford; Maldon; Brentwood; Basildon; Rochford; Castle Point; Southend-on-Sea; Thurrock

Essex (/ˈɛsɪks/ ESS-iks) is a ceremonial county in the East of England. It is bordered by Cambridgeshire and Suffolk to the north, the North Sea to the east, Kent across the Thames Estuary to the south, Greater London to the south-west, and Hertfordshire to the west. The largest settlement is Southend-on-Sea.

The county has an area of 3,670 km^{2} (1,420 sq mi) and had an estimated population of 1,929,610 in 2024. The south of the county is densely populated, and includes Southend-on-Sea in the south-east and Basildon in the south-centre. The centre and north of the county is more rural, and its principal settlements include Chelmsford in the centre and Colchester in the north-east. The districts of Chelmsford, Colchester and Southend hold city status. For local government purposes Essex comprises a non-metropolitan county, with twelve districts, and two unitary authority areas: Thurrock and Southend-on-Sea. The county historically included north-east Greater London, the River Lea forming its western border.

Essex is a low-lying county with a flat coastline. It contains pockets of ancient woodland, including Epping Forest in the south-west, and in the north-east shares Dedham Vale national landscape with Suffolk. The coast is one of the longest of any English county, at 562 miles (905 km). It is deeply indented by estuaries, the largest being those of the Stour, which forms the Suffolk border, the Colne, Blackwater, Crouch, and the Thames in the south. Parts of the coast are wetland and salt marsh, including a large expanse at Hamford Water, and it contains several large beaches.

What is now Essex was occupied by the Trinovantes tribe during the Iron Age. They established a settlement at Colchester, which is the oldest recorded town in Britain. The town was conquered by the Romans but subsequently sacked by the Trinovantes during the Boudican revolt. In the Early Middle Ages the region was invaded by the Saxons, who formed the Kingdom of Essex; they were followed by the Vikings, who after winning the Battle of Maldon were able to extract the first Danegeld from King Æthelred. After the Norman Conquest much of the county became a royal forest, and in 1381 the populace of the county were heavily involved in the Peasants' Revolt. The subsequent centuries were more settled, and the county's economy became increasingly tied to that of London; in the nineteenth century the railways allowed coastal resorts such as Clacton-on-Sea to develop and the Port of London to shift downriver to Tilbury. Subsequent development has included the new towns of Basildon and Harlow, the development of the Harwich International Port, and petroleum industry.

== History ==
Essex evolved from the Kingdom of the East Saxons, a polity which is likely to have its roots in the territory of the Iron Age Trinovantes tribe.

=== Iron Age ===
In the Iron Age, Essex and parts of southern Suffolk were controlled by the local Trinovantes tribe. Their production of their own coinage marks them out as one of the more advanced tribes on the island, this advantage (in common with other tribes in the south-east) is probably due to the Belgic element within their elite. Their capital was the oppidum (a type of town) of Colchester, Britain's oldest recorded town, which had its own mint. The tribe were in extended conflict with their western neighbours, the Catuvellauni, and steadily lost ground. By AD 10 they had come under the complete control of the Catuvellauni, who took Colchester as their own capital.

=== Roman ===
The Roman invasion in Essex of AD 43 began with a landing on the south coast, probably in the Richborough area of Kent. After some initial successes against the Britons, they paused to await reinforcements, and the arrival of the Emperor Claudius. The combined army then proceeded to the capital of the Catevellauni-Trinovantes at Colchester, and took it.

Claudius held a review of his invasion force on Lexden Heath where the army formally proclaimed him Imperator. The invasion force that assembled before him included four legions, mounted auxiliaries and an elephant corps – a force of around 30,000 men. At Colchester, the kings of 11 British tribes surrendered to Claudius.

Colchester became a Roman Colonia, with the official name Colonia Claudia Victricensis ('the City of Claudius' Victory'). It was initially the most important city in Roman Britain and in it they established a temple to the God-Emperor Claudius. This was the largest building of its kind in Roman Britain.

The establishment of the Colonia is thought to have involved extensive appropriation of land from local people, this and other grievances led to the Trinovantes joining their northern neighbours, the Iceni, in the Boudiccan revolt. The rebels entered the city, and after a Roman last stand at the temple of Claudius, methodically destroyed it, massacring many thousands. A significant Roman force attempting to relieve Colchester was destroyed in pitched battle, known as the Massacre of the Ninth Legion.

The rebels then proceeded to sack London and St Albans, with Tacitus estimating that 70–80,000 people were killed in the destruction of the three cities. Boudicca was defeated in battle, somewhere in the west midlands, and the Romans are likely to have ravaged the lands of the rebel tribes, so Essex will have suffered greatly.

Despite this, the Trinovantes' identity persisted. Roman provinces were divided into civitas for local government purposes – with a civitas for the Trinovantes strongly implied by Ptolemy. Christianity is thought to have been flourishing among the Trinovantes in the fourth century; indications include the remains of a probable church at Colchester. The church dates from sometime after 320, shortly after Constantine the Great granted freedom of worship to Christians in 313. Other archaeological evidence include a chi-rho symbol etched on a tile at a site in Wickford, and a gold ring inscribed with a chi-rho monogram found at Brentwood.

The late Roman period, and the period shortly after, was the setting for the King Cole legends based around Colchester. One version of the legend concerns St Helena, the mother of Constantine the Great. The legend makes her the daughter of Coel, Duke of the Britons (King Cole) and in it she gives birth to Constantine in Colchester. This, and related legends, are at variance with biographical details as they are now known, but it is likely that Constantine, and his father, Constantius spent time in Colchester during their years in Britain. The presence of St Helena in the country is less certain.

=== Anglo-Saxon period ===
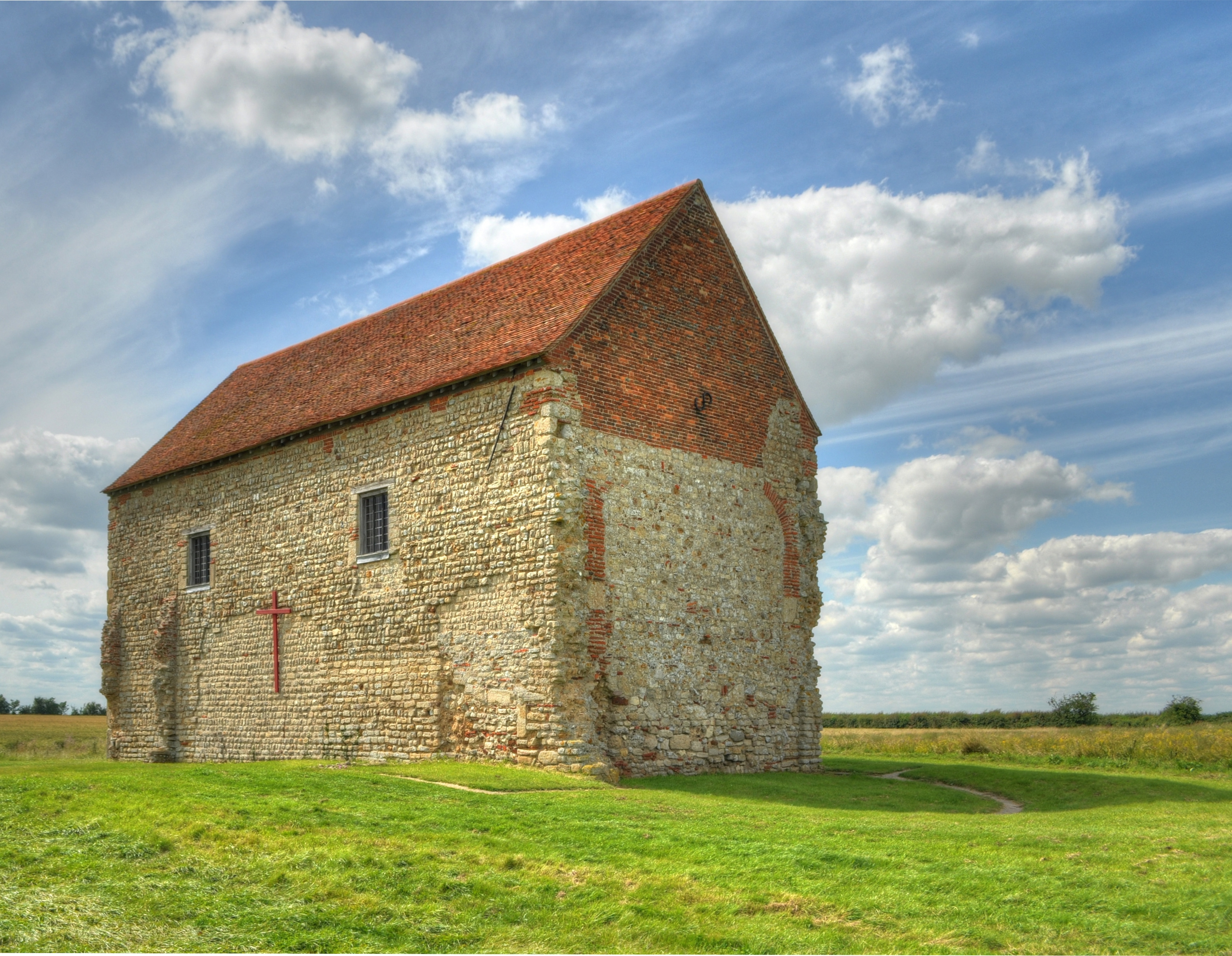
St Peters Chapel, Bradwell. Established by St Cedd, the patron saint of Essex around 662, built on the site of the abandoned Roman fort of Othona

The name Essex originates in the Anglo-Saxon period of the Early Middle Ages and has its root in the Anglo-Saxon (Old English) name Ēastseaxe ('East Saxons'), the eastern kingdom of the Saxons who had come from the continent and settled in Britain. Excavations at Mucking have demonstrated the presence of Anglo-Saxon settlers in the early fifth century, however the way in which these settlers became ascendent in the territory of the Trinovantes is not known. Studies suggest a pattern of typically peaceful co-existence, with the structure of the Romano-British landscape being maintained, and with the Saxon settlers believed to have been in the minority.

The first known king of the East Saxons was Sledd in 587, though there are less reliable sources giving an account of Aescwine (other versions call him Erkenwine) founding the kingdom in 527. The early kings of the East Saxons were pagan and uniquely amongst the Anglo-Saxon kingdoms traced their lineage back to Seaxnēat, god of the Saxons, rather than Woden. The kings of Essex are notable for their S-nomenclature, nearly all of them begin with the letter S.

The Kingdom of the East Saxons included not just the subsequent county of Essex, but also Middlesex (including the City of London), much of Hertfordshire and at times also the sub-Kingdom of Surrey. The Middlesex and Hertfordshire parts were known as the Province of the Middle Saxons since at least the early eighth century but it is not known if the province was previously an independent unit that came under East Saxon control. Charter evidence shows that the Kings of Essex appear to have had a greater control in the core area, east of the Lea and Stort, that would subsequently become the county of Essex. In the core area they granted charters freely, but further west they did so while also making reference to their Mercian overlords.

The early kings were pagan, together with much and perhaps by this time all of the population. Sledd's son Sebert converted to Christianity around 604 and St Paul's Cathedral in London was established. On Sebert's death in 616 his sons renounced Christianity and drove out Mellitus, the Bishop of London. The kingdom re-converted after St Cedd, a monk from Lindisfarne and now the patron saint of Essex, converted Sigeberht II the Good around 653.

In 824, Ecgberht, the King of the Wessex and grandfather of Alfred the Great, defeated the Mercians at the Battle of Ellandun in Wiltshire, fundamentally changing the balance of power in southern England. The small kingdoms of Essex, Sussex and of Kent, previously independent albeit under Mercian overlordship, were subsequently fully absorbed into Wessex.

The later Anglo-Saxon period shows three major battles fought with the Norse recorded in Essex; the Battle of Benfleet in 894, the Battle of Maldon in 991 and the Battle of Assandun (probably at either Ashingdon or Ashdon) in 1016. The county of Essex was formed from the core area, east of the River Lea, of the former Kingdom of the East Saxons in the 9th or 10th centuries and divided into groupings called hundreds. Before the Norman Conquest the East Saxons were subsumed into the Kingdom of England.

=== After the Norman Conquest ===
Having conquered England, William the Conqueror initially based himself at Barking Abbey, an already ancient nunnery, for several months while a secure base, which eventually became the Tower of London, could be established in the city. While at Barking William received the submission of some of England's leading nobles. The invaders established a number of castles in the county, to help protect the new elites in a hostile country. There were castles at Colchester, Castle Hedingham, Rayleigh, Pleshey and elsewhere. Hadleigh Castle was developed much later, in the thirteenth century.

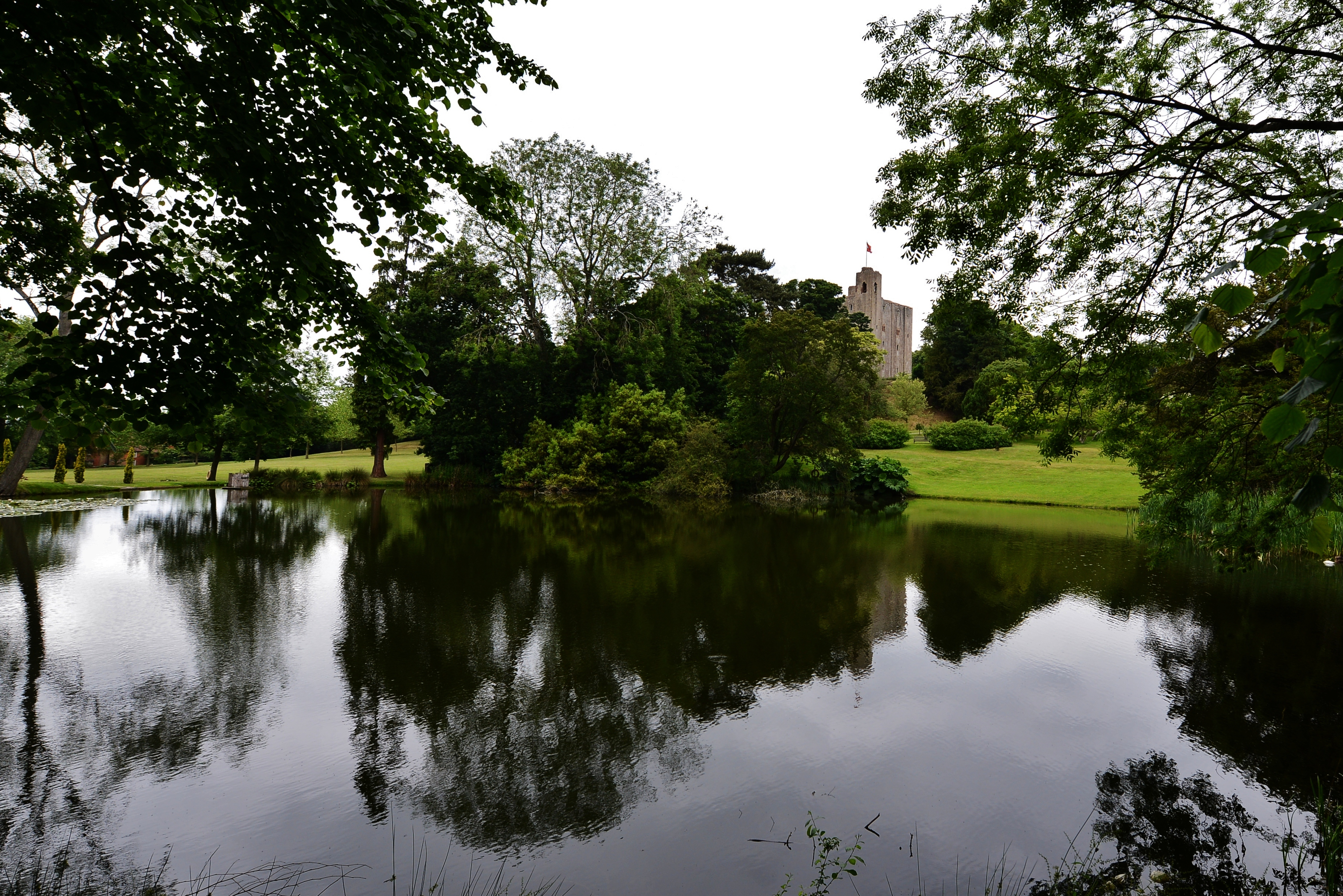
Hedingham Castle and garden

After the arrival of the Normans, the Forest of Essex was established as a royal forest, however, at that time, the term was a legal term. There was a weak correlation between the area covered by the Forest of Essex (the large majority of the county) and the much smaller area covered by woodland. An analysis of Domesday returns for Essex has shown that the Forest of Essex was mostly farmland, and that the county as a whole was 20% wooded in 1086. In 1218, Chelmsford became the county town.

After that point population growth caused the proportion of woodland to fall steadily until the arrival of the Black Death, in 1348, killed between a third and a half of England's population, leading to a long term stabilisation of the extent of woodland. Similarly, various pressures led to areas being removed from the legal Forest of Essex and it ceased to exist as a legal entity after 1327, and after that time Forest Law applied to smaller areas: the forests of Writtle (near Chelmsford), long lost Kingswood (near Colchester), Hatfield, and Waltham Forest.

Waltham Forest had covered parts of the Hundreds of Waltham, Becontree and Ongar. It also included the physical woodland areas subsequently legally afforested (designated as a legal forest) and known as Epping Forest and Hainault Forest).

=== Peasants' Revolt, 1381 ===
The Black Death significantly reduced England's population, leading to a change in the balance of power between the working population on one hand, and their masters and employers on the other. Over a period of several decades, national government brought in legislation to reverse the situation, but it was only partially successful and led to simmering resentment.

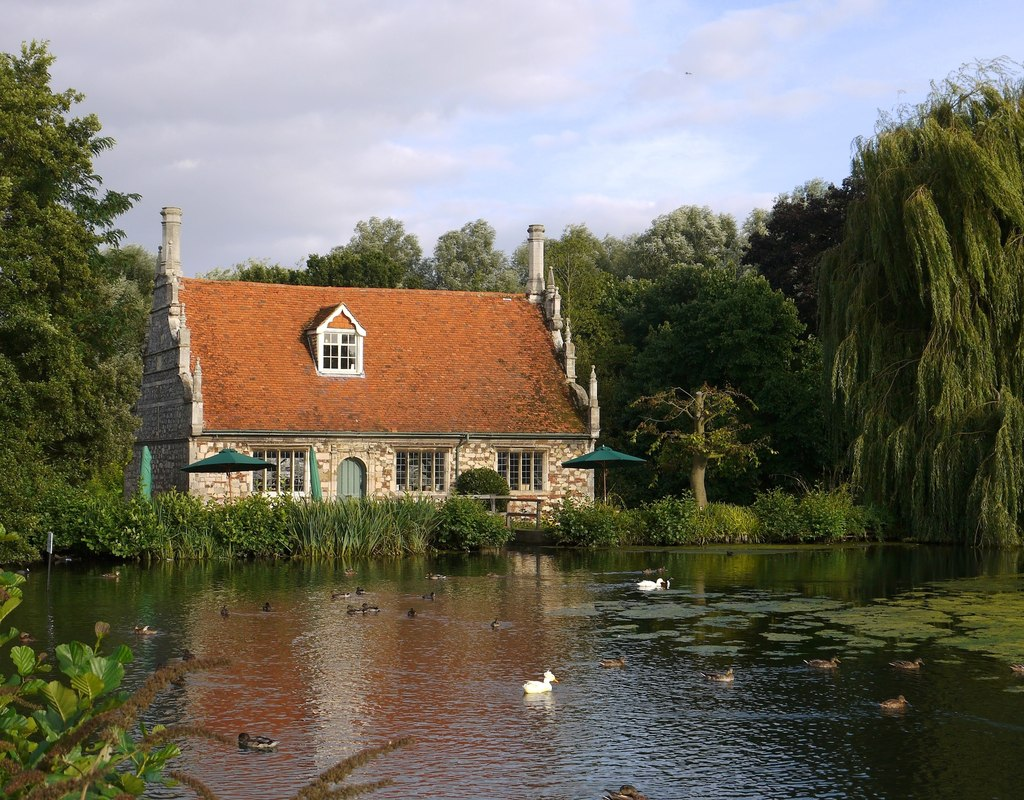
Bourne Mill

By 1381, England's economic situation was very poor due to the war with France, so a new Poll Tax was levied with commissioners being sent round the country to interrogate local officials in an attempt to ensure tax evasion was reduced and more money extracted. This was hugely unpopular and the Peasants' Revolt broke out in Brentwood on 1 June 1381. The revolt was partly inspired by the egalitarian preaching of the radical Essex priest John Ball.

Several thousand Essex rebels gathered at Bocking on 4 June, and then divided. Some heading to Suffolk to raise rebellion there, with the rest heading to London, some directly – via Bow Bridge and others may have gone via Kent. A large force of Kentish rebels under Wat Tyler, who may himself have been from Essex, also advanced on London while revolt also spread to a number of other parts of the country.

The rebels gained access to the walled City of London and gained control of the Tower of London. They carried out extensive looting in the capital and executed a number of their enemies, but the revolt began to dissipate after the events at West Smithfield on 15 June, when the Mayor of London, William Walworth, killed the rebel leader Wat Tyler. The rebels prepared to fire arrows at the royal party but the 15 year old King Richard II rode toward the crowd and spoke to them, defusing the situation, in part by making a series of promises he did not subsequently keep.

Having bought himself time, Richard was able to receive reinforcements and then crush the rebellion in Essex and elsewhere. His forces defeated rebels in battle at Billericay on 28 June, and there were mass executions including hangings and disembowellings at Chelmsford and Colchester.

=== Wars of the Roses ===
In 1471, during the Wars of the Roses a force of around 2,000 Essex supporters of the Lancastrian cause crossed Bow Bridge to join with 3,000 Kentish Lancastrian supporters under the Bastard of Fauconberg.

The Essex men joined with their allies in attempting to storm Aldgate and Bishopsgate during an assault known as the Siege of London. The Lancastrians were defeated, and the Essex contingent retreated back over the Lea with heavy losses.

=== Armada ===
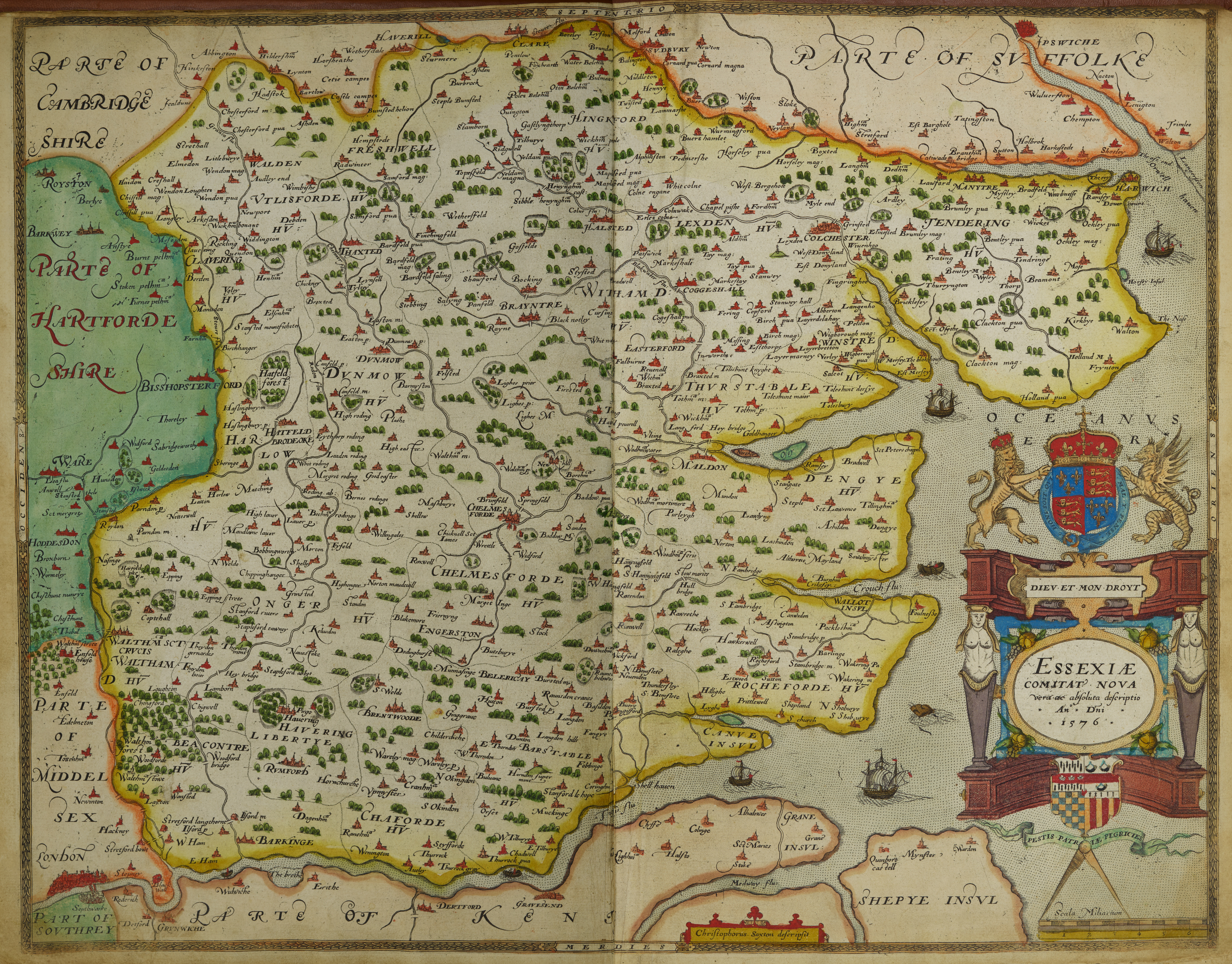
Hand-drawn map of Essex by Christopher Saxton in 1576

In 1588, Tilbury Fort was chosen as the focal point of the English defences against King Philip II's Spanish Armada, and the large veteran army he had ordered to invade England. The English believed that the Spanish would land near the Fort, so Queen Elizabeth's small and relatively poorly trained forces gathered at Tilbury, where the Queen made her famous speech to the troops.

I know I have the body of a weak, feeble woman; but I have the heart and stomach of a king, and of a king of England too, and think foul scorn that Parma or Spain, or any prince of Europe, should dare to invade the borders of my realm; to which rather than any dishonour shall grow by me, I myself will take up arms, I myself will be your general, judge, and rewarder of every one of your virtues in the field.

=== Essex and the Netherlands ===
The tradition of generally friendly relations between England and the Netherlands is reflected in the history of Essex. In the 16th century, many Dutch and Flemish refugees came to Essex and the name of the Dutch Quarter in Colchester is a legacy of that time. In the 17th century Dutch engineers would be used to drain part of Essex's coastal marshes.

In the early 1620s, Dutchman Cornelius Vermuyden repaired a sea wall at Dagenham and was working to reclaim Canvey Island. The latter project was financed by Joas Croppenburg, a Dutch haberdasher to whom Vermuyden was related by marriage. Around 200 Dutch workers and refugees settled in Canvey around that time, establishing a church on the island.

=== Civil War ===
Essex, London and the eastern counties backed Parliament in the English Civil War, but by 1648, this loyalty was stretched. In June 1648 a force of 500 Kentish Royalists landed near the Isle of Dogs, linked up with a small Royalist cavalry force from Essex, fought a battle with local parliamentarians at Bow Bridge, then crossed the River Lea into Essex.

The combined force, bolstered by extra forces, marched towards Royalist held Colchester, but a Parliamentarian force caught up with them just as they were about to enter the city's medieval walls, and a bitter battle was fought but the Royalists were able to retire to the security of the walls. The Siege of Colchester followed, but ten weeks' starvation and news of Royalist defeats elsewhere led the Royalists to surrender.

=== 19th century ===
The population of Essex at the time of the 1841 census was 344,979.

== Demographics ==
Ethnic composition (Essex and Thurrock, 2011)
White British	88.3%
White Other	3.6%
Asian	2.6%
Black	2.0%
Mixed	1.5%
Other	0.4%
Total White	91.9%
Total Ethnic Minority	8.1%

Between the 2001 census and 2021, Essex and Thurrock became significantly more ethnically diverse. The proportion of residents identifying as White British fell from 94.3% in 2001 to 83.1% in 2021, while the overall White population declined from 96.9% to 88.9%. During the same period, all minority ethnic groups increased in both number and proportion of the population. The Asian population saw the largest growth growth, rising from 1.1% in 2001 to 4.1% in 2021, driven largely by increases in the Indian and Pakistani communities, particularly in Thurrock and to a lesser extent, Southend.. The Black population also had large growth, growing from 0.5% to 3.5%. Residents identifying with any Mixed groups rosefrom 0.9% in 2001 to 2.5% in. The “Other ethnic group” category also grew substantially, especially after 2011.

A disproportionate number of the non-ethnic British population and new arrivals are clustered in Thurrock. The Nigerian population has increased by 62% between 2011 and 2021, at 5,500 people. The Romanian population in the district has gone from 300 to 5,200, a number which is likely to have risen since the 2021 census.

The demographics of rural, north, central and urban southern areas (excluding Thurrock and to a lesser extent, Southend) have remained overwhelmingly White British.

== Geography ==
The ceremonial county of Essex is bounded by Kent, south of the Thames Estuary; Greater London to the south-west; Hertfordshire, broadly west of the River Lea and the Stort; Cambridgeshire to the northwest; Suffolk broadly north of the River Stour; with the North Sea to the east. In bordering London, it is regarded as one of the home counties.

The highest point of the county of Essex is Chrishall Common near the village of Langley, close to the Hertfordshire border, which reaches 482 feet (147 m).

=== Boundaries ===
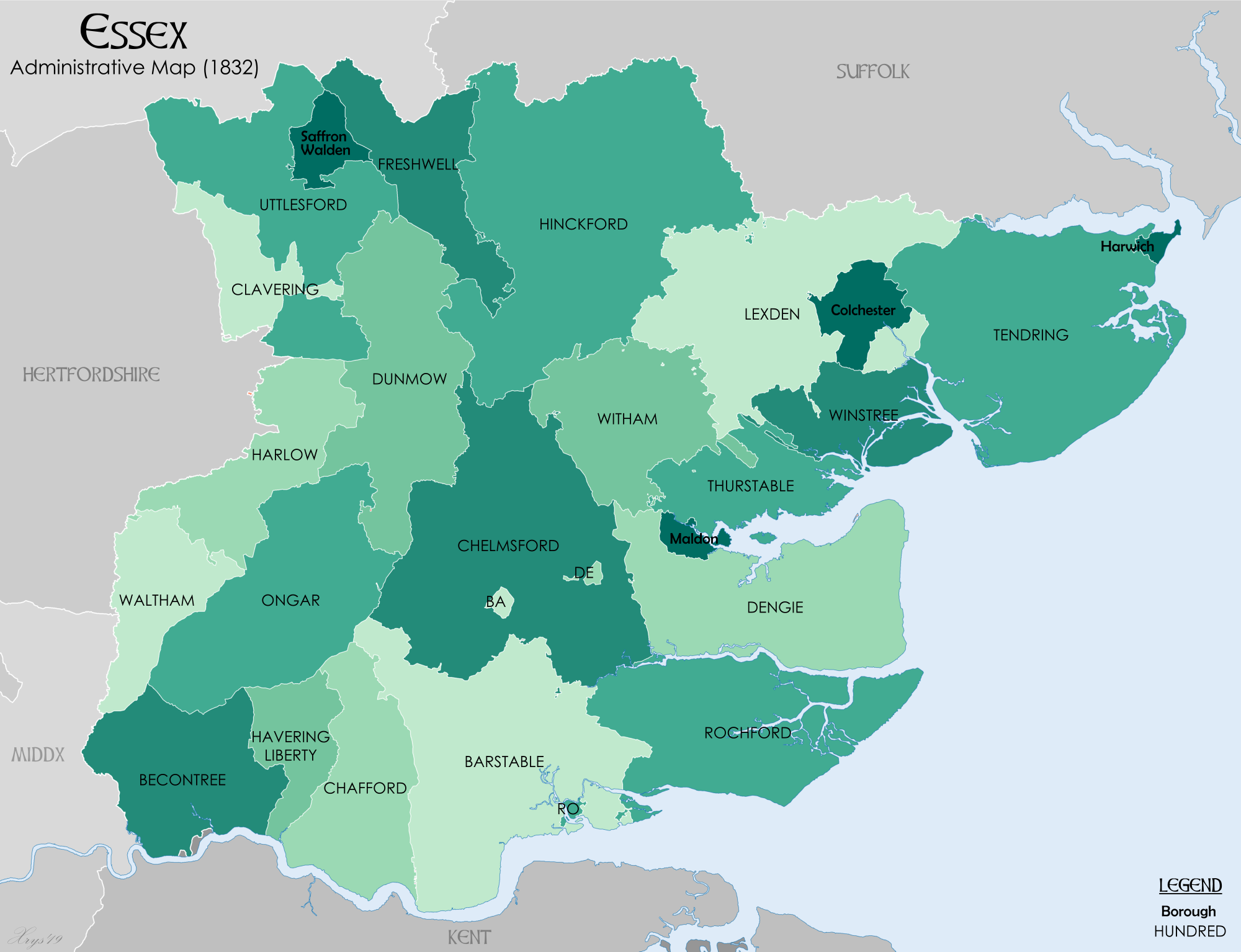
Map of the historic county and its constituent hundreds

In England, the term county is currently applied to both the ceremonial counties (or lieutenancy areas) and the administrative (or non-metropolitan) counties. It can also be applied to the former historic counties and the former postal counties. Essex therefore, has different boundaries depending on which type of county is being referred to.

=== Historic county ===
The largest extent of Essex was the historic (or ancient) county. This boundary of Essex was established in the late Anglo-Saxon period, sometime after the larger former Kingdom of the East Saxons had lost its independence.

It included the whole ceremonial county, as well as the three north-western parishes transferred to Cambridgeshire in 1889, other smaller areas (such as the Bartlow Hills transferred to neighbours at the same time, and the five London boroughs administered as part of Essex until 1965.

=== Administrative county ===
The administrative county and County Council was formed in 1889. The county was made a non-metropolitan county (a new type of administrative county) in 1974, meaning the role of the administrative county was redefined, as part of the 1970s local government reorganisation. Its present boundaries were set in 1998 when Thurrock and Southend-on-Sea were separated from the non-metropolitan county to become unitary authorities.

=== Ceremonial county ===
In 1997, the Lieutenancies Act defined Essex for ceremonial purposes as the current non-metropolitan county and the unitary authorities formerly part of it.

=== Postal county ===
Until 1996, the Royal Mail additionally divided Britain into postal counties, used for addresses. Although it adopted many local government boundary changes, the Royal Mail did not adopt the 1965 London boundary reform due to cost. Therefore, parts of post-1965 Greater London continued to have an Essex address. The postal county of Hertfordshire also extended deep into west Essex, with Stansted isolated as an exclave of postal Essex. In 1996, postal counties were discontinued and replaced entirely by postcodes, though customers may still use a county, which will be ignored in the sorting process.

Sewardstone in the south-west of the ceremonial county, was outside the former Essex postal county, being covered by the London post town (E4).

=== Coast ===
The deep estuaries on the east coast give Essex, by some measures, the longest coast of any county. These estuaries mean the county's North Sea coast is characterised by three major peninsulas, each named after the Hundred based on the peninsula:

- Tendring between the Stour and the Colne.
- Dengie between the Blackwater and the Crouch
- Rochford between the Crouch and the Thames

A consequence of these features is that the broad estuaries defining them have been a factor in preventing any transport infrastructure linking them to neighbouring areas on the other side of the river estuaries, to the north and south.

=== Settlement patterns ===
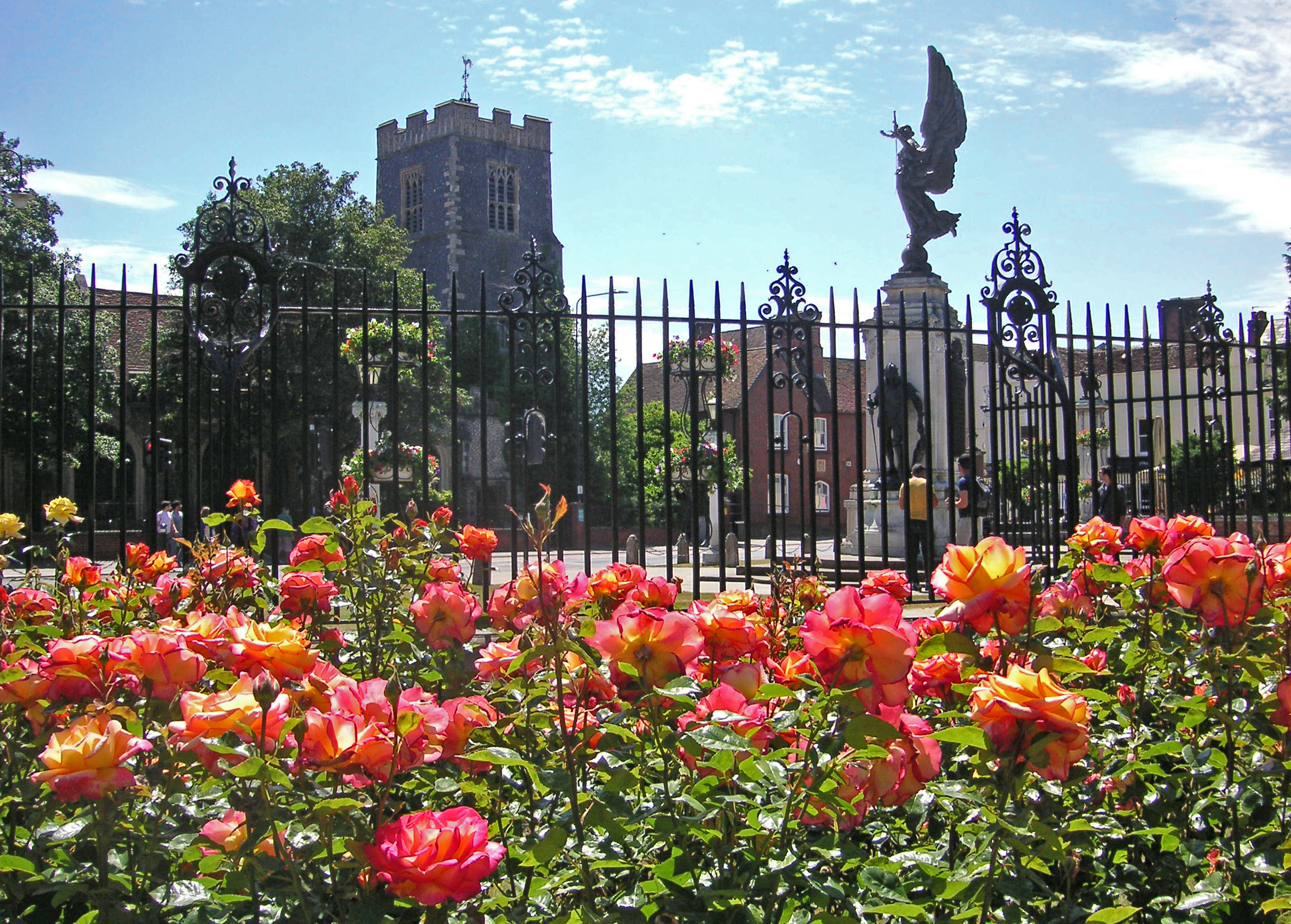
Colchester occupies the site of Camulodunum, the first major city in Roman Britain and its first capital. Colchester claims to be Britain's first city.

The pattern of settlement in the county is diverse. The areas closest to London are the most densely settled, though the Metropolitan Green Belt has prevented the further sprawl of London into the county. The Green Belt was initially a narrow band of land, but subsequent expansions meant it was able to limit the further expansion of many of the commuter towns close to the capital. The Green Belt zone close to London includes many prosperous commuter towns, as well as the new towns of Basildon and Harlow, originally developed to resettle Londoners after the destruction of London housing in the Second World War; they have since been significantly developed and expanded. Epping Forest also prevents the further spread of the Greater London Urban Area. As it is not far from London, with its economic magnetism, many of Essex's settlements, particularly those near or within short driving distance of railway stations, function as dormitory towns or villages where London workers raise their families. In these areas a high proportion of the population commute to London, and the wages earned in the capital are typically significantly higher than more local jobs. Many parts of Essex therefore, especially those closest to London, have a major economic dependence on London and the transport links that take people to work there.

Part of the south-east of the county, already containing the major population centres of Basildon, Southend and Thurrock, is within the Thames Gateway and designated for further development. Parts of the south-west of the county, such as Buckhurst Hill and Chigwell, are contiguous with Greater London neighbourhoods and therefore form part of the Greater London Urban Area.

In rural parts of the county, there are many small towns, villages and hamlets largely built in the traditional materials of timber and brick, with clay tile or thatched roofs.

== Administrative history ==
=== Before the County Council ===
The county was administered by a Sheriff of Essex from medieval times. From the time of Henry VIII onwards, there was also a Lord Lieutenant of Essex, who took over the sheriff's former responsibilities relating to military functions, notably becoming responsible for the county's militia. The sheriff retained responsibility for the administration of justice. The sheriff was responsible for organising the county-level courts, with serious cases heard by visiting judges at the assizes and less serious cases heard by the county's magistrates at the quarter sessions. The quarter sessions gradually also took on a variety of administrative functions, such as maintenance of roads and bridges, supervision of the poor laws, administration of county prisons and setting the County Rate.

The county was anciently subdivided into units known as Hundreds. At a very early but unknown date, small parts of the county on the east bank of the Stort, near Bishops Stortford and Sawbridgeworth were transferred to Hertfordshire

=== County Councils ===
Essex County Council was formed in 1889, taking over the administrative functions of the quarter sessions. However, County Boroughs of West Ham (1889–1965), Southend-on-Sea (1914–1974) and East Ham (1915–1965) formed part of the county but were county boroughs (not under county council control, in a similar manner to unitary authorities today). 12 boroughs and districts provide more localised services such as rubbish and recycling collections, leisure and planning, as shown in the map on the right.

The north-west tip of Essex, the parishes of Great Chishill, Little Chishill and Heydon, were transferred to Cambridgeshire when the County Councils were created in 1889. Parts of a number of other parishes were also transferred at that time, and since.

=== Greater London established ===
The boundary with Greater London was established in 1965, when East Ham and West Ham county boroughs and the Barking, Chingford, Dagenham, Hornchurch, Ilford, Leyton, Romford, Walthamstow and Wanstead and Woodford districts as well as a part of Chigwell were transferred to form the London boroughs of Barking and Dagenham, Havering, Newham, Redbridge and Waltham Forest.

=== Two unitary authorities ===
In 1998, the boroughs of Southend-on-Sea and Thurrock were separated from the administrative county of Essex after successful requests to become unitary authorities.

=== Devolution and local government reorganisation ===
In 2025, Essex County Council and the fourteen local councils are working with central government on a scheme to reorganise how Essex is governed. A new elected mayor would take on some of the responsibilities of the county council, replace the Essex Police, Fire and Crime Commissioner, and have new powers devolved from central government. Essex County Council, the two unitary authorities and the twelve borough and district Councils would be also be replaced, with the current plans being for three, four or five unitary authorities.

On 25 March 2026, the Secretary of State for Housing, Communities and Local Government announced his decision that Essex would be reorganised into five unitary authorities. These proposals were withdrawn in September 2026.

== Governance ==
=== National ===
Essex became part of the East of England Government Office Region in 1994 and was statistically counted as part of that region from 1999, having previously been part of the South East England region.

Results of the 2024 UK general election in Essex

Essex is represented by eighteen seats in the House of Commons, each electing one Member of Parliament (MP). Following the 2024 general election, the county was represented by ten Conservative Party MPs, five from the Labour Party, two from Reform UK and one Liberal Democrat. Subsequently, the number of Reform UK MPs has fallen to one, and there is now one independent member.

The Conservatives have historically dominated in the county. In 2017, the party won all eighteen Essex seats, and repeated this in 2019, receiving over 50% of the vote in every Essex constituency and almost 65% of the county's total votes. In this election, Castle Point recorded the highest Conservative vote share of any constituency in the United Kingdom with 76.7%, and the most marginal seat in the county was Colchester, which the Conservatives still held by a majority of over 9,400 votes. Essex has previously elected a small number of Labour MPs, with the party winning in Thurrock in all but one general election between 1945 and 2005, and also holding Harlow and Basildon from 1997 until 2010. The Liberal Democrats held the seat of Colchester from 1997 until the 2015 election. The 2015 election saw a large vote in Essex for the UK Independence Party (UKIP); the county was the site of UKIP's only victory in the election, with Douglas Carswell retaining the seat of Clacton that he had won in a 2014 by-election. The party also gained support in other Essex constituencies, receiving over 30% of the vote in Thurrock and Castle Point. UKIP's vote share declined in 2017 and the party lost their only seat.

The Conservatives experienced a marked fall in support in Essex at the 2024 general election, receiving fewer than half the votes they did in 2019. Reform UK, led by former UKIP leader Nigel Farage, received over 20% of the votes in the county. Two of the party's five MPs elected in 2024 represent Essex constituencies, including Clacton, which was won by Farage. The Labour Party recovered Thurrock and Harlow, gained Colchester and won seats in Southend-on-Sea for the first time in their history. The Liberal Democrats also won in Chelmsford for the first time.

In the 2016 EU referendum, 62.3% of voters in Essex voted to leave the EU, with all 14 District Council areas voting to leave, the smallest margin being in Uttlesford.

UK general election results in Essex
Party	Votes				% Votes				Seats			
Party	2015	2017	2019	2024	2015	2017	2019	2024	2015	2017	2019	2024
Conservative Party	436,758	528,949	577,118	270,382	49.6	59.0	64.8	32.9	17	18	18	10
Labour Party	171,026	261,671	189,471	235,891	19.4	29.2	21.2	28.7	0	0	0	5
Reform UK				179,977				21.9				2
Liberal Democrats	58,592	46,254	95,078	78,238	6.6	5.1	10.6	9.5	0	0	0	1
Green Party	25,993	12,343	20,438	42,582	3.0	1.3	2.3	5.2	0	0	0	0
UKIP	177,756	41,478		273	20.2	4.6		0.0	1	0		0
Other parties	3,718	1,662	2,278	3,984	0.4	0.2	0.3	0.5	0	0	0	0
Independents	6,919	4,179	10,224	10,059	0.7	0.4	1.1	1.2	0	0	0	0
Total	879,918	896,231	894,608	821,386	100%	100%	100%	100%	18	18	18	18

=== County-wide ===
The coat of arms of Essex County Council

Essex Police and Essex County Fire and Rescue Service covers the ceremonial county. The county council governs the non-metropolitan county of Essex in England. It has 75 councillors, elected from 70 divisions, some of which elect more than one member, but before 1965, the number of councillors reached over 100. The council is currently under Conservative majority control, with the party holding 52 of the 75 council seats. ^{[2]} The council meets at County Hall in the centre of Chelmsford.

At the time of the 2011 census it served a population of 1,393,600, which makes it one of the largest local authorities in England. As a non-metropolitan county council, responsibilities are shared between districts (including boroughs) and in many areas also between civil parish (including town) councils. Births, marriages/civil partnerships and death registration, roads, libraries and archives, refuse disposal, most of state education, of social services and of transport are provided at the county level.^{[3]}

The county council was formed in 1889, governing the administrative county of Essex. The county council was reconstituted in 1974 as a non-metropolitan county council, regaining jurisdiction in Southend-on-Sea; however, the non-metropolitan county was reduced in size in 1998 and the council passed responsibilities to Southend-on-Sea Borough Council and Thurrock Council in those districts. For certain services the three authorities co-operate through joint arrangements, such as the Essex fire authority.

==== County Hall ====
The county council chamber and main headquarters is at the County Hall in Chelmsford. Before 1938, the council regularly met in London near Moorgate, which with significant parts of the county close to that point and the dominance of railway travel had been more convenient than any place in the county. The County Hall, made a listed building in 2007, dates largely from the mid-1930s and is decorated with fine artworks of that period, mostly the gift of the family who owned the textile firm Courtaulds.

=== Borough and district level ===
The county of Essex is divided into 12 district and borough councils with 2 unitary authorities (Southend on Sea and Thurrock). The 12 councils manage housing, local planning, refuse collection, street cleaning, elections and meet in their respective civic offices. The local representatives are elected in parts in local elections, held every year.

==== Youth councils ====
The Essex County Council also has a Youth Assembly, 75 members aged between 11 and 19 who aim to represent all young people in their districts across Essex. They decide on the priorities for young people and campaign to make a difference. With this, some district and unitary authorities may have their own youth councils, such as Epping Forest, Uttlesford and Harlow.

All these councillors are elected by their schools. The elections to the Young Essex Assembly occur in the respective schools in which the candidates are standing, likewise for the youth councils at a district and unitary level. These young people will then go on to represent their school and their parish/ward or (in the case of the Young Essex Assembly) their entire district. The initiative seeks to engage younger people in the county and rely on the youth councillors of all status to work closely with schools and youth centres to improve youth services in Essex and help promote the opinions of Essex youth.

=== Town and parish level ===
Town and parish councils vary in size from those with a population of around 200 to those with a population of over 30,000. Annual expenditure can vary greatly, depending on the circumstances of the individual council. Parish and town councils (local councils) have the same powers and duties, but a town council may elect a town mayor, rather than a chairman, each year in May.

There are just under 300 town and parish councils within Essex. These Councils have no statutory duties but can contribute to local life in a range of ways, such as maintaining allotments and open spaces, to crime prevention and providing recreation facilities. They can also influence other decision makers and can deliver services to meet local needs. Their powers and duties range

Town and parish councils have the right to become statutory consultees at both district and county level and, although the decision remains with the planning authorities, local councils can influence the decision-making process by making informed comments and recommendations.

== Economy ==
A high proportion of the population, especially in the south, work outside the county, commuting to London and elsewhere by rail and by road. These London-based jobs are often well paid and complement the contribution made by the employers based within Essex.

Industry is largely limited to the south of the county, with the majority of the land elsewhere being given over to agriculture. Harlow is a centre for electronics, science and pharmaceutical companies. Chelmsford has been an important location for electronics companies, such as the Marconi Company, since the industry was born; it is also the location for a number of insurance and financial services organisations and, until 2015, was the home of the soft drinks producer Britvic. Basildon is home to New Holland Agriculture's European headquarters as well as the Ford Motor Company's British HQ. Debden, in Loughton, is home to a production facility for British and foreign banknotes.

Other businesses in the county are dominated by mechanical engineering, including but not limited to metalworking, glassmaking and plastics and the service sector. Colchester is a garrison town and the local economy is helped by the Army's personnel living there. Basildon is the location of State Street Corporation's United Kingdom HQ International Financial Data Services and remains heavily dependent on London for employment, due to its proximity and direct transport routes. Southend-on-Sea is home to the Adventure Island theme park and is one of the few still growing British seaside resorts, benefiting from modern and direct rail links from Fenchurch Street railway station and Liverpool Street station (so that housing is in high demand, especially for financial services commuters), which maintains the town's commercial and general economy.

Parts of eastern Essex suffer from high levels of deprivation; one of the most highly deprived wards is in the seaside town of Clacton. In the Indices of deprivation 2007, Jaywick was identified as the most deprived Lower Super Output Area in Southern England. Unemployment was estimated at 44% and many homes were found to lack very basic amenities. The Brooklands and Grasslands area of Jaywick was found to be the third-most deprived area in England; two areas in Liverpool and Manchester were rated more deprived. In contrast, mid, west and south-west Essex is one of the most affluent parts of eastern England, forming part of the London commuter belt. There is a large middle class here and the area is widely known for its private schools. In 2008, The Daily Telegraph found Ingatestone and Brentwood to be the 14th- and 19th-richest towns in the UK respectively.

== Transport ==
Much of Essex lies within the London commuter belt, with radial transport links to the capital an important part of the area's economy. There are nationally or regionally important ports and airports and these also rely on the Essex infrastructure, causing an additional load on the local road and rail links.

=== Railway ===
Essex's railway routes to London are, running clockwise:

- The West Anglia Main Line from Liverpool Street to Harlow, Stansted Airport and onward to Cambridgeshire.
- The southern part of Epping Forest district is served by the London Underground Central line.
- The Great Eastern Main Line from Liverpool Street to Shenfield, Chelmsford, Colchester and onto East Anglia. The Great Eastern includes branch lines to:
1. Harwich and its port.
2. The Sunshine Coast Line linking Colchester to the seaside resorts of Clacton-on-Sea and Walton-on-the-Naze.
3. Braintree.
4. Branch from Marks Tey to Sudbury, Suffolk, and villages in-between.
5. In the densely populated south, there is a branch to Southend Victoria, the Rochford Peninsula and several south Essex towns. This branch has a sub-branch – the Crouch Valley Line – linking Wickford to the remote Dengie Peninsula, including Burnham-on-Crouch and Southminster.
- The London, Tilbury and Southend line (operated by c2c) also serves Southend (Southend Central), the Rochford Peninsula and many towns in the densely populated south of the county. The London terminus is Fenchurch Street and heading eastward from Barking, the line separates into three, which later merge back into one by the time the railway reaches Pitsea.

The West Anglia and Great Eastern Main Line and their branches are operated by Greater Anglia. CrossCountry runs services to Stansted Airport.

=== Road ===
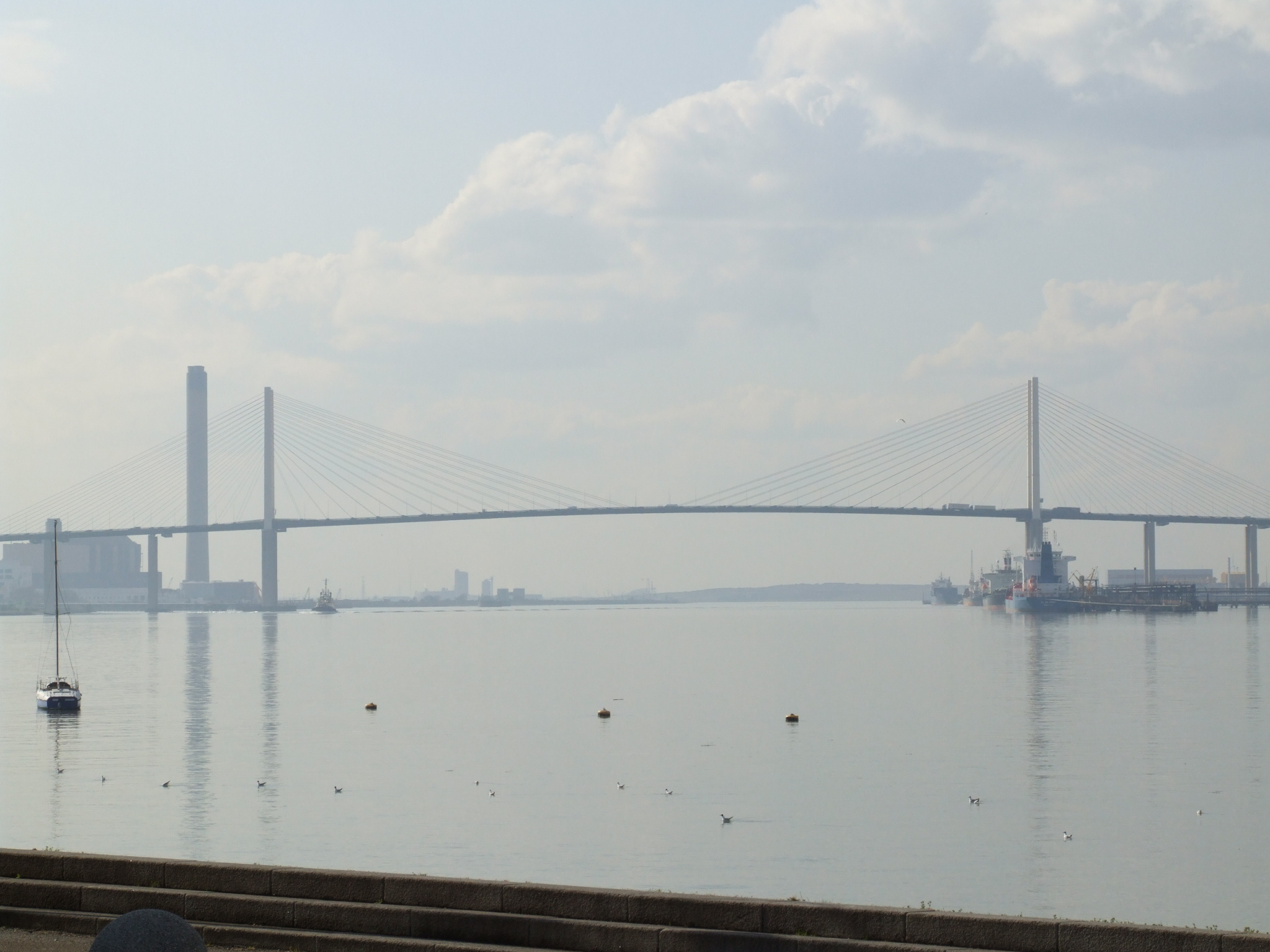
Queen Elizabeth II Bridge spanning the Thames from West Thurrock, Essex, to Dartford, Kent

Essex has six main strategic routes, five of which reflect the powerful influence exerted by London.

The M25 is London's orbital motorway which redistributes traffic across the London area. It includes the Dartford Road Crossings, over the Thames Estuary, linking Essex to Kent.

There are four radial commuter routes into the capital:

- M11 motorway, which also serves Stansted Airport and provides commuter links to Cambridge.
- A12, to East Anglia via Chelmsford and Colchester. It also serves the ports of Harwich and Felixstowe (Suffolk).
- A127, to the Rochford Peninsula, including Southend and Southend Airport. This is no longer maintained as a trunk road.
- A13, to the Rochford Peninsula, also including Southend. It also serves the expanding Tilbury and London Gateway ports.

The A120 is a major route heading west from the ports of Harwich and Felixstowe (Suffolk) and, like the A12, the route was in use during the Roman period and, in part at least, before then.

There are also multiple other main routes, including: The A414, connecting Harlow to Maldon The A130, connecting Chelmsford to Canvey Island And the A131, connecting Chelmsford to Sudbury

The A11 to Norwich runs along the Essex-Cambridgeshire border for a short distance.

=== Ports and waterborne transport ===
The Port of Tilbury is one of Britain's three major ports and has proposed a major extension onto the site of the former Tilbury power stations. The port of Harwich has passenger and freight services to the Hook of Holland and a freight service to Europoort. A service to Esbjerg, Denmark ceased in September 2014 and earlier a service to Cuxhaven in Germany was discontinued in December 2005.

The UK's largest container terminal London Gateway at Shell Haven in Thurrock partly opened in November 2013; final completion date is yet to be confirmed. The port was opposed by the local authority and environmental and wildlife organisations.

The ports have branch lines to connect them to the national rail network. These freight movements conflict with the needs of commuter passenger services, limiting their frequency and reliability.

East of the Dartford Road Crossing to Dartford in Kent, across the Thames Estuary, a pedestrian ferry to Gravesend, Kent operates from Tilbury during limited daily hours; there are pedestrian ferries across some of Essex's rivers and estuaries in spring and summer.

=== Airports ===
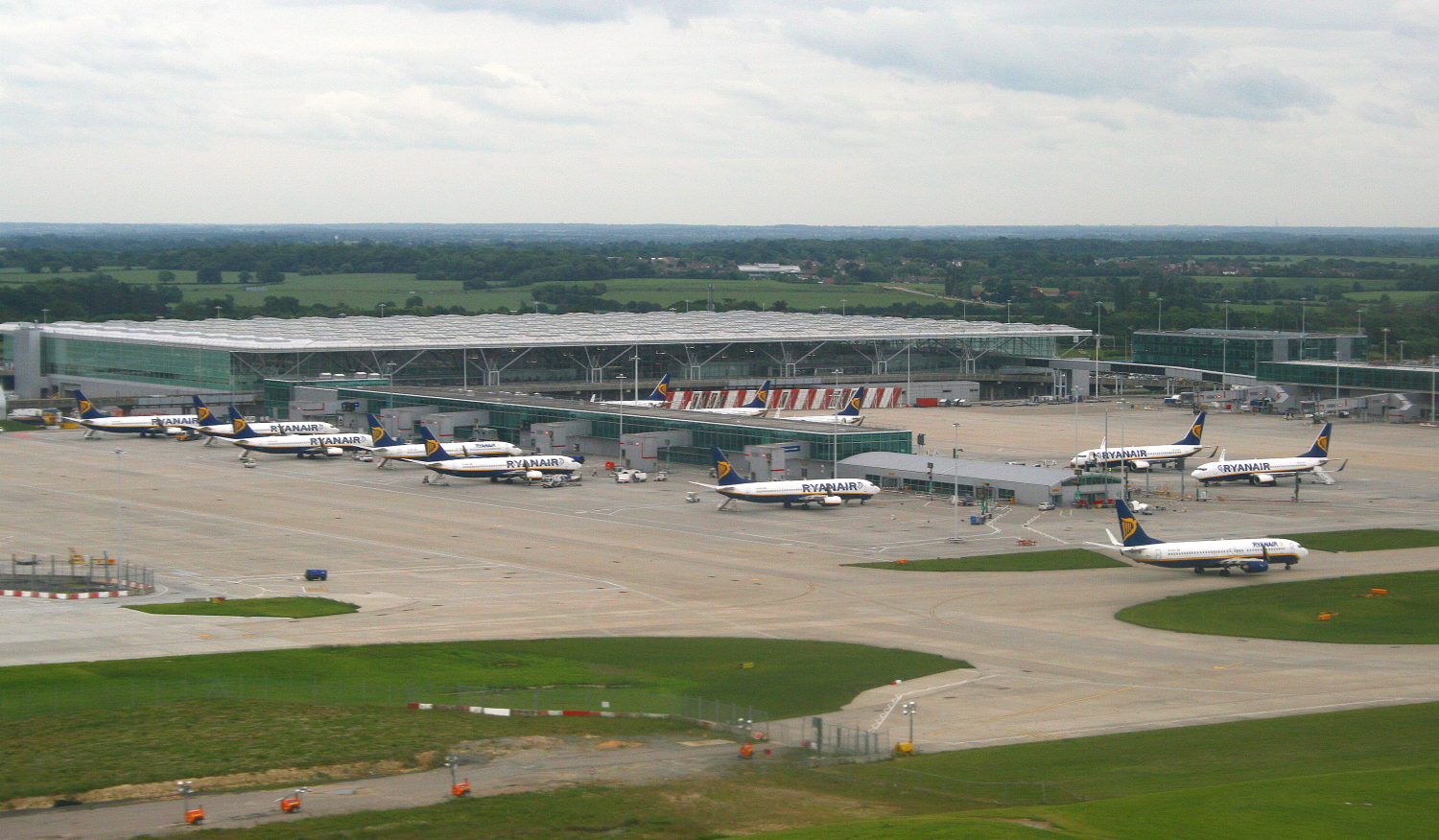
Stansted Airport, in the north west of the county

The main airport in Essex is Stansted Airport, serving destinations in Europe, North Africa and Asia. The Conservative-Liberal Democrat coalition government, formed in May 2010, agreed not to allow a further runway until a set time period, so curtailing the operator's ambitions for expansion. London Southend Airport, once one of Britain's busiest airports, opened a new runway extension, terminal building and railway station in March 2012. It has a station on the Shenfield to Southend Line, with a direct link to London.

Southend Airport has scheduled flights to Ireland, the Channel Islands and multiple destinations in Europe. Essex has several smaller airfields, some of which owe their origins to military bases built during World War I or World War II, giving pleasure flights or flying lessons; these include Clacton Airfield, Earls Colne Airfield and Stapleford Aerodrome.

== Culture and community ==
=== Symbols ===
The flag of the historic county of Essex

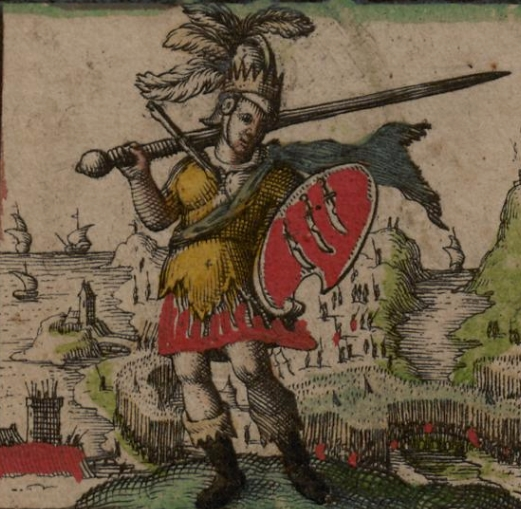
Depiction of the first king of the East Saxons, Æscwine, his shield showing the three seaxes emblem attributed to him (from John Speed's 1611 Saxon Heptarchy)

Both the flag of Essex and the county's coat of arms comprise three Saxon seax knives (although they look rather more like scimitars), mainly white and pointing to the right (from the point of view of the observer), arranged vertically one above another on a red background (Gules three Seaxes fesswise in pale Argent pommels and hilts Or, points to the sinister and notches to the base). The three-seax device is also used as the official logo of Essex County Council; this was granted in 1932.

The emblem was attributed to Anglo-Saxon Essex in early modern historiography. The earliest reference to the arms of the East Saxon kings was by Richard Verstegan, the author of A Restitution of Decayed Intelligence (Antwerp, 1605), claiming that "Erkenwyne king of the East-Saxons did beare for his armes, three [seaxes] argent, in a field gules". There is no earlier evidence substantiating Verstegan's claim, which is an anachronism for the Anglo-Saxon period seeing that heraldry only evolved in the 12th century, well after the Norman Conquest.

John Speed in his Historie of Great Britaine (1611) follows Verstegan in his descriptions of the arms of Erkenwyne, but he qualifies the statement by adding "as some or our heralds have emblazed".

The cowslip is the county plant of Essex.

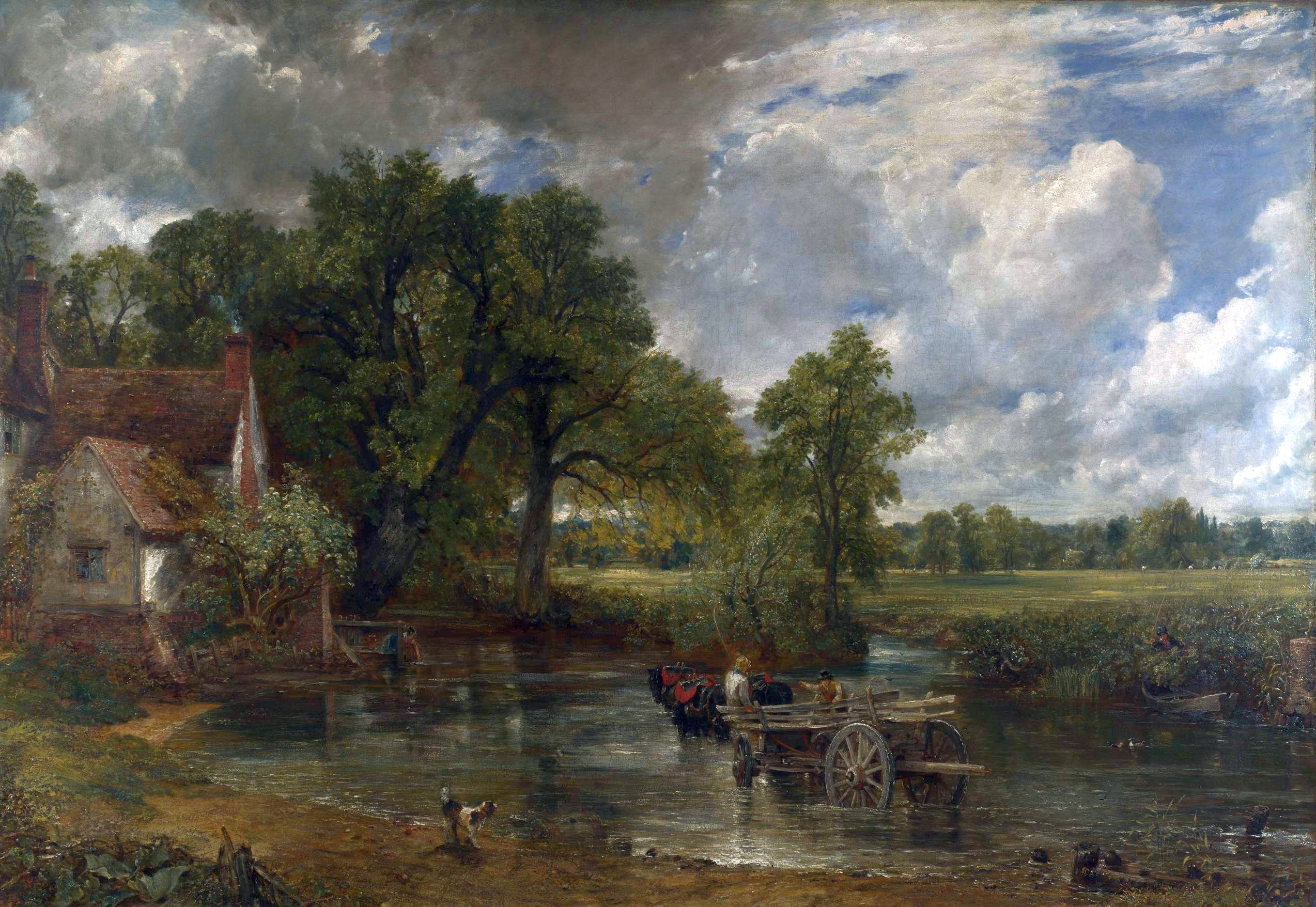
The Hay Wain by John Constable shows the Essex landscape on the right bank.

=== Patron saint ===
The East Saxon royal house had converted to Christianity around 604 AD, but subsequently apostasised. In the mid 7th century, a new Christian king, Sigeberht the Good, requested help from the monks of Lindisfarne in promoting Christianity among his people.

St Cedd, an Irish trained Northumbrian monk, sailed south and established a chapel, dedicated to St Peter, on the site of the old Roman fort of Othona (modern Bradwell-on-Sea), a chapel which still stands. Cedd, who was well known for confronting political authority, filled the vacant position of Bishop of London – the Bishop of the East Saxons. The feast day of St Cedd, also known as Essex Day, is marked on 26 October.

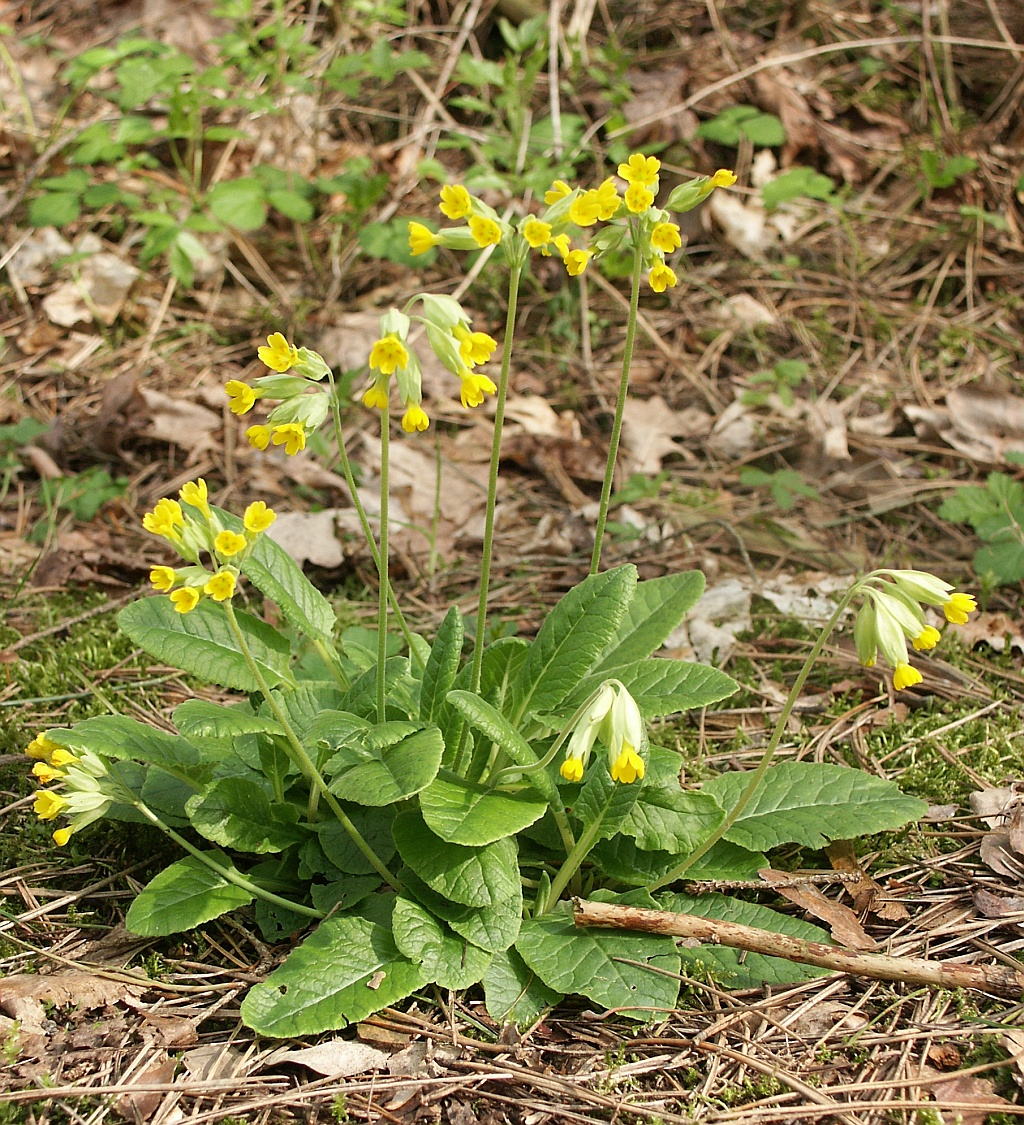
Cowslip, the county plant of Essex

=== Speech ===
The county has its own Essex dialect, though this has lost ground to other forms so that it is now chiefly spoken in parts of the north and among older residents. It has been partially replaced by Received Pronunciation (RP) and Cockney, a form originally heavily influenced by the Essex dialect.

The prevalence of Cockney, particularly in the south, is the result of the large-scale migration of East Londoners to Essex, the Cockney Diaspora, particularly after World War II. A blend of RP and Cockney is widely heard, and known as Estuary English.

=== Essex army units ===
Essex would supply two line infantry regiments, the 44th (East Essex) Regiment of Foot and the 56th (West Essex) Regiment of Foot. In 1881 they merged to form the Essex Regiment, nicknamed the Pompadours due to their "Rose Pompadour" (maroon) facing colour. The regiment would later merge into the Royal Anglian Regiment.

The Essex Militia was a reserve force with medieval roots that was merged into the Essex Regiment as reserve units, upon its establishment in 1881. The Essex Yeomanry was a local reserve cavalry unit.

16 Air Assault Brigade, which recruits nationwide, is based in Colchester.

=== Traditions ===
Essex is also home to the Dunmow Flitch Trials, a traditional ceremony that takes place every four years and consists of a test of a married couple's devotion to one another. A common claim of the origin of the Dunmow Flitch dates back to 1104 and the Augustinian priory of Little Dunmow, founded by Lady Juga Baynard. Lord of the Manor Reginald Fitzwalter and his wife dressed themselves as humble folk and begged blessing of the Prior a year and a day after marriage. The prior, impressed by their devotion, bestowed upon them a flitch of bacon. Upon revealing his true identity, Fitzwalter gave his land to the priory on condition that a flitch should be awarded to any couple who could claim they were similarly devoted.

By the 14th century, the Dunmow Flitch Trials appear to have achieved a significant reputation outside the local area. The author William Langland, who lived on the Welsh borders, mentions it in his 1362 book The Vision of Piers Plowman in a manner that implies general knowledge of the custom among his readers.

Essex was known for its numerous calves. For example, William Carew Hazlitt wrote in 1869, "If a man beats a bush in Essex, out jumps a calf." People from Essex became known as Essex calves while the calves were described ironically as Essex lions.

=== Television ===
The county is served by BBC East and ITV Anglia, but southern parts of Essex are also served by BBC London and ITV London.

=== Radio ===
Local radio stations are BBC Essex, Heart East, Greatest Hits Radio East (formerly Dream 100 FM), Radio Essex (covering Mid and South Essex), Actual Radio (covering Colchester and North East Essex) and Phoenix FM (covering Brentwood and Billericay).

== Sport ==
=== Cricket ===
Essex County Cricket Club became a first-class county in 1894. The county has won eight County Championship league titles; six of these were won during the dominant period between 1979 and 1992, with a gap of 25 years before the county's next titles in 2017 and 2019.

=== Football ===
The ceremonial county is home to three professional sides, Colchester United, Southend United and Braintree Town. Three additional clubs (West Ham United, Leyton Orient and Dagenham & Redbridge) have grounds located within the historical Essex boundaries. Essex also has a number of other clubs which play below English football's fifth tier. Chelmsford City plays in the National League South. The highest domestic trophy for non-league teams, the FA Trophy, has been won on five occasions by Essex teams: Colchester United (1992), Canvey Island F.C. (2001), Grays Athletic (2005 and 2006) and by Southend United in 2026. The FA Vase has been won three times by Billericay Town F.C. in 1976, 1977 and 1979, and by Stansted in 1984.

=== Racing ===
The county formerly was home to Speedway teams the Lakeside Hammers (formerly Arena Essex Hammers), the Rayleigh Rockets and the Romford Bombers.

During the 2012 London Olympics, Hadleigh Farm played host to the mountain bike races.

Essex has one horse racing venue, Chelmsford City Racecourse at Great Leighs. Horse racing also took place at Chelmsford Racecourse in Galleywood until 1935. The county has one current greyhound racing track, Harlow Stadium. Rayleigh Weir Stadium and Southend Stadium are former greyhound venues.

=== Other sports ===
The county is also home to the Romford Raiders and Chelmsford Chieftains ice hockey teams, as well as the amateur rugby league football teams the Eastern Rhinos and Brentwood Eels (Essex Eels). The county's basketball team is Essex Leopards, a defunct teams include the Essex Pirates basketball team.

=== Notable people ===
Many famous sports stars have come from or trained in Essex. These have included swimmer Mark Foster; cricket stars Trevor Bailey, Nasser Hussain, Alastair Cook and Graham Gooch; footballers Peter Taylor, James Tomkins, Justin Edinburgh, Nigel Spink; tennis stars John Lloyd and David Lloyd; Olympic gold-winning hurdler Sally Gunnell, Olympic Gold-winning gymnast Max Whitlock; Olympic sailing champion Saskia Clark; World Champion snooker stars Stuart Bingham and Steve Davis; world champion boxers Terry Marsh, Nigel Benn and Frank Bruno; London Marathon winner Eamonn Martin; international rugby players Malcolm O'Kelly and Stuart Barnes; Wimbledon and Australian Open men's doubles winner Henry Patten; Formula 1 drivers Johnny Herbert, Perry McCarthy and Oliver Bearman.

== Education ==
Education in Essex is substantially provided by three authorities: Essex County Council and the two unitary authorities, Southend-on-Sea and Thurrock. In all there are some 90 state secondary schools provided by these authorities, the majority of which are comprehensive, although one in Uttlesford, two in Chelmsford, two in Colchester and four in Southend-on-Sea are selective grammar schools. There are also various independent schools particularly, as mentioned above, in rural parts and the west of the county.

The University of Essex, which was established in 1963, is located just outside Colchester, with two further campuses in Loughton and Southend-on-Sea.

Anglia Ruskin University has a campus in Chelmsford. Lord Ashcroft International Business School, Faculty of Medical Science, Faculty of Science and Technology, Anglia Law School, Faculty of Health, Social Care & Education and School of Medicine are located in the campus area.

Writtle University College, at Writtle, near Chelmsford, offers both higher and further education in land-management subjects.

== Landmarks and places of interest ==
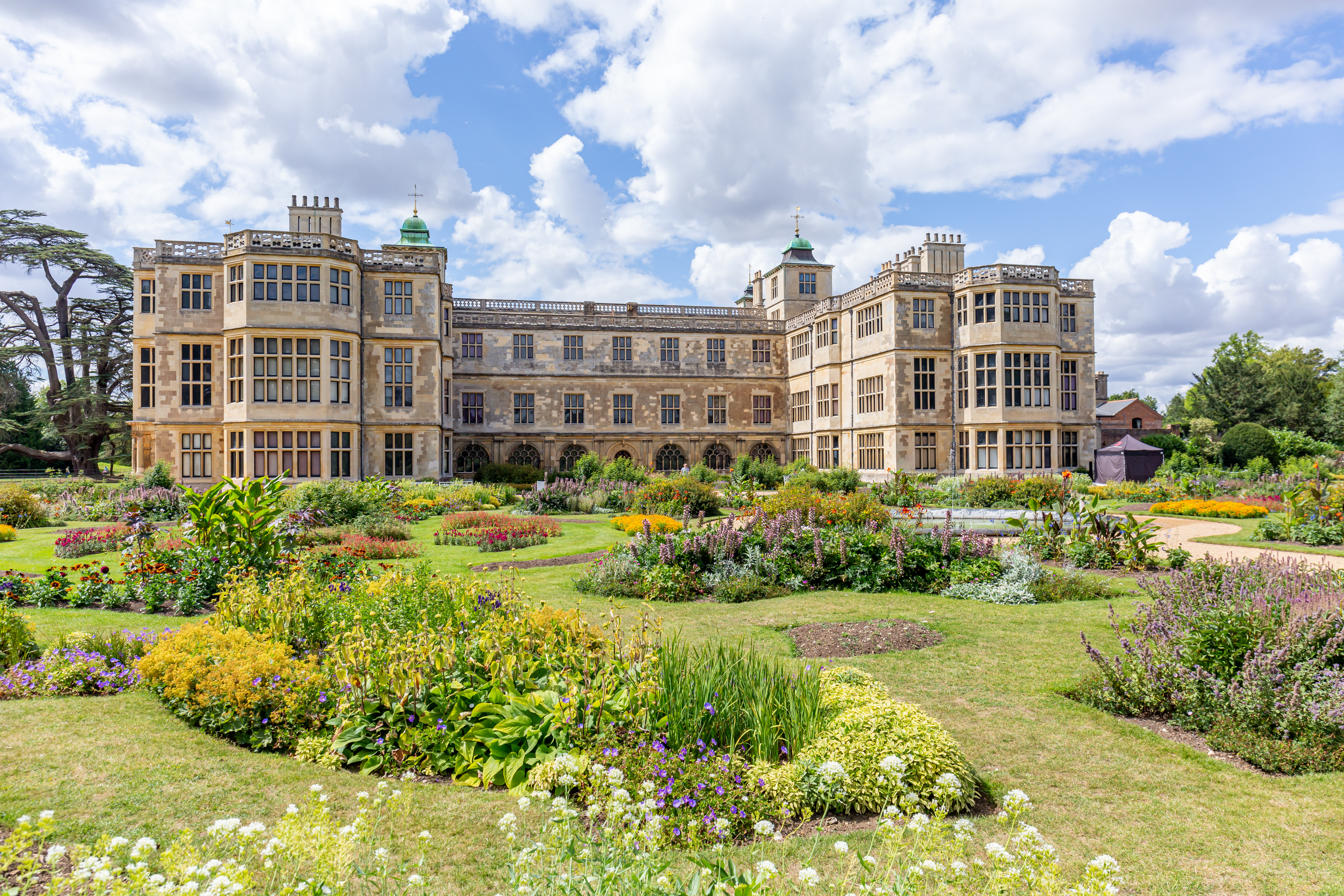
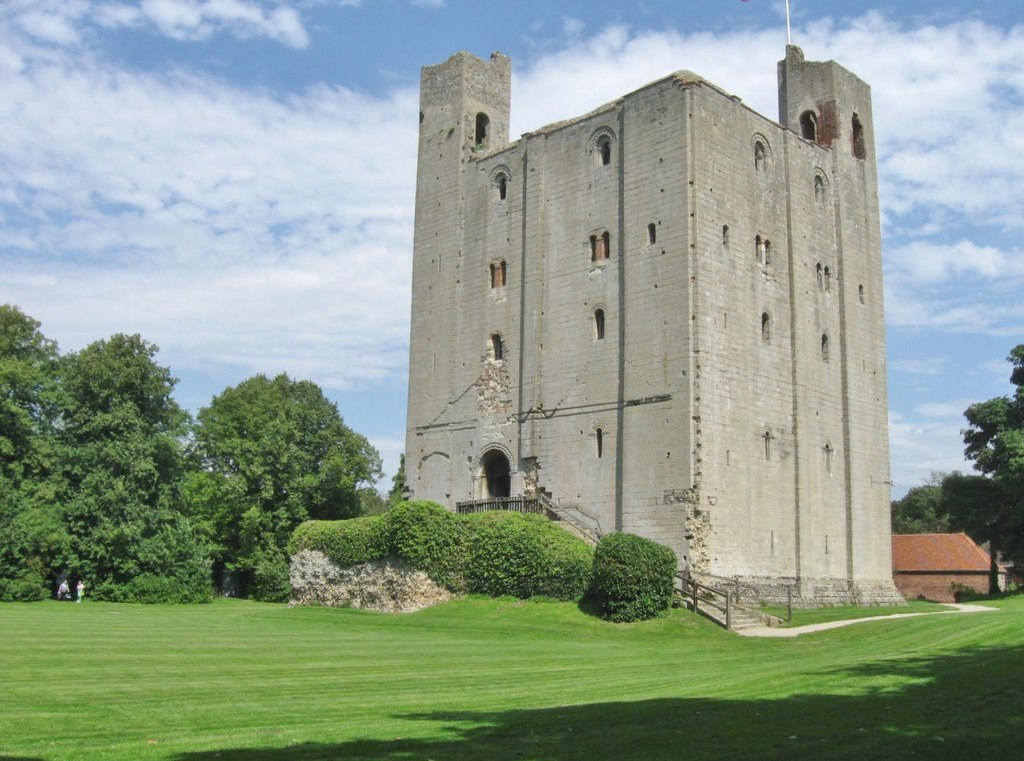
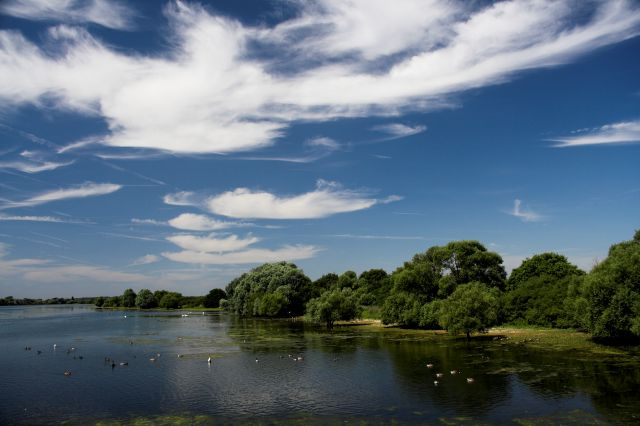
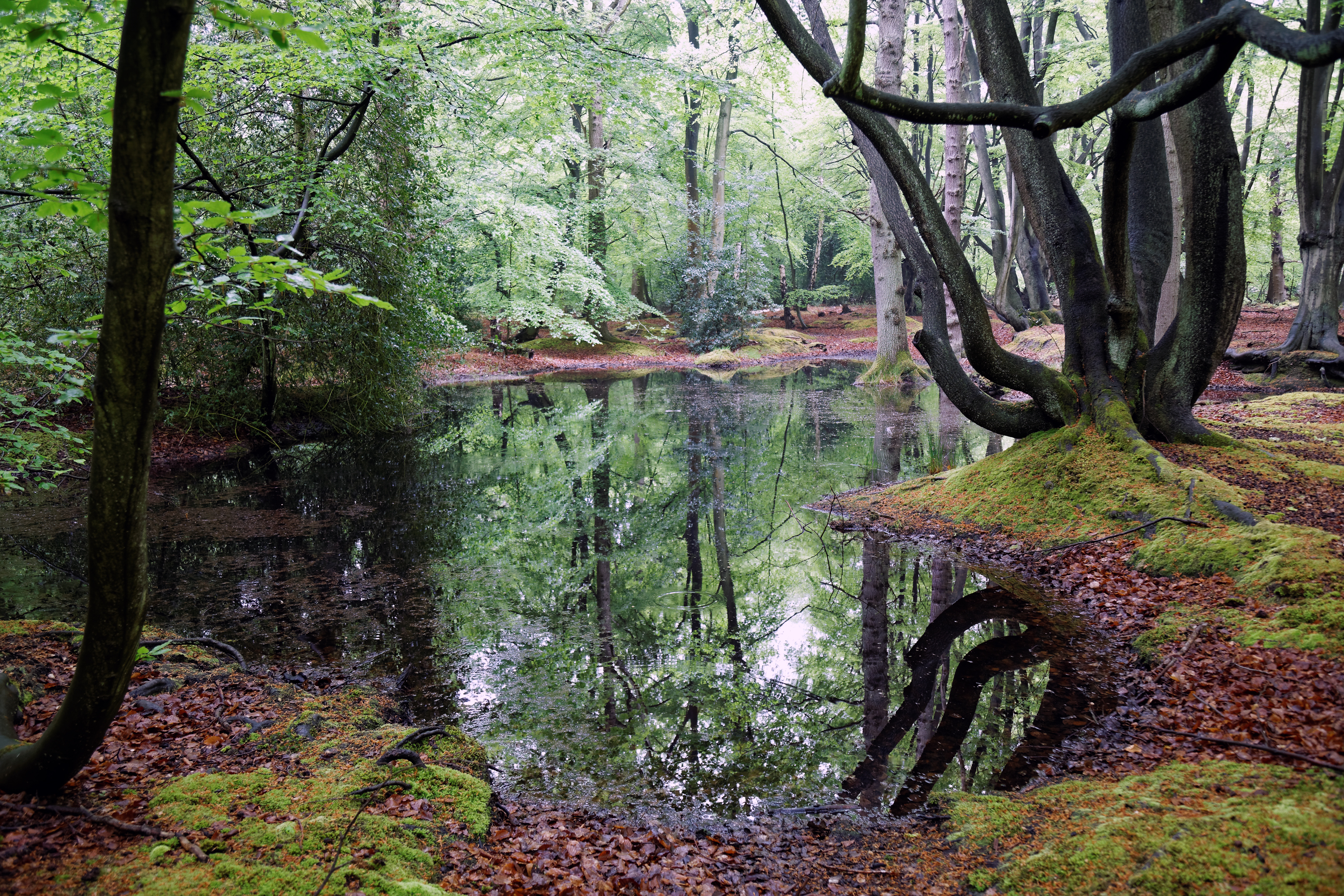
Audley End House; Hedingham Castle; Abberton Reservoir; and Epping Forest

Over 14,000 buildings have listed status in the county and around 1,000 of those are recognised as of Grade I or II* importance. The buildings include the 7th century Saxon church of St Peter-on-the-Wall and the clubhouse of the Royal Corinthian Yacht Club which was the United Kingdom's entry in the 'International Exhibition of Modern Architecture' held at the Museum of Modern Art in New York City in 1932. Southend Pier is in the Guinness Book of Records as the longest pleasure pier in the world

Key
	Abbey/Priory/Cathedral
Accessible open space	Accessible open space
	Amusement/Theme Park
	Castle
Country Park	Country Park
	English Heritage
	Forestry Commission
Heritage railway	Heritage railway
Historic house	Historic House
Places of Worship	Places of Worship
Museum (free) Museum	Museum (free/not free)
National Trust	National Trust
	Theatre
	Zoo

- Abberton Reservoir
- Anglia Ruskin University Chelmsford campus
- Ashdon (The site of the ancient Bartlow Hills and also a claimant as the location of the Battle of Ashingdon)
- Ashingdon (The site of the Battle of Ashingdon in 1016), near Southend, with its isolated St Andrews Church and site of England's earliest aerodrome at South Fambridge
- Audley End House and Gardens, Saffron Walden
- Brentwood Cathedral
- Clacton-on-Sea
- Chelmsford Cathedral
- Colchester Castle
- Colchester Zoo
- Colne Valley Railway
- Cressing Temple
- East Anglian Railway Museum
- Epping Forest
- Epping Ongar Railway
- Finchingfield (home of the author Dodie Smith)
- Frinton-on-Sea
- Great Bentley
- Greensted Church
- Hadleigh Castle
- Harlow New Town
- Hedingham Castle, between Stansted and Colchester, to the north of Braintree
- Ingatestone Hall, Ingatestone, between Brentwood and Chelmsford
- Kelvedon Hatch Secret Nuclear Bunker
- Lakeside Shopping Centre
- Loughton, near Epping Forest
- Maldon historic market town, close to Chelmsford and the North Sea, and site of the Battle of Maldon
- Mangapps Railway Museum (Burnham-on-Crouch)
- Marsh Farm Country Park (South Woodham Ferrers)
- Mersea Island, birdwatching and rambling resort with one settlement, West Mersea
- Mistley Towers, Manningtree, between Colchester and Ipswich, near Alton Water.
- Mountfitchet Castle, Stansted
- North Weald Airfield
- Northey Island
- Orsett Hall Hotel, Prince Charles Avenue, Orsett near Chadwell St Mary
- Royal Gunpowder Mills in Waltham Abbey
- St Peter-on-the-Wall
- Saffron Walden
- Southend Pier
- Thames Estuary
- Tilbury Fort
- Thaxted, south of Saffron Walden
- Tillingham, Picturesque village mentioned in War of the Worlds
- Thurrock Thameside Nature Park
- University of Essex (Wivenhoe Park, Colchester and Loughton)
- Waltham Abbey Church

== Sister counties and regions ==
- Jiangsu, China
- Picardy, France
- Thuringia, Germany
- Accra, Ghana
- Henrico County, Virginia, United States

== See also ==
- Custos Rotulorum of Essex – Keepers of the Rolls
- Earl of Essex
- Essex (UK Parliament constituency)
- Essex Police and Crime Commissioner
- Healthcare in Essex
- High Sheriff of Essex
- List of civil parishes in England
- List of English and Welsh endowed schools (19th century)#Essex
- List of Sites of Special Scientific Interest in Essex
- Lord Lieutenant of Essex
- Q Camp: WWII camp in Essex
- University of Essex
- The Hundred Parishes
