= Bow Bridge, London =

Former bridge in London, England

Coordinates: 51°31′46.96″N 0°0′49.05″W

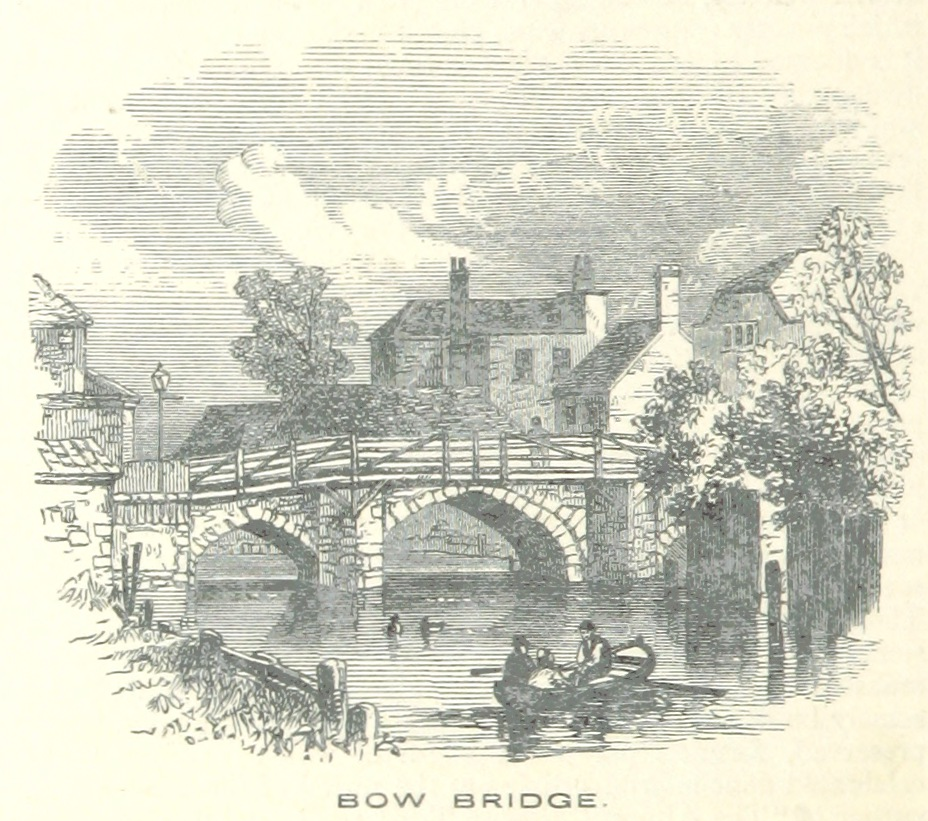
Bow Bridge depicted in the 19th Century

Bow Bridge was a stone bridge built over the River Lea, in what is now London, in the twelfth century. It took its name from the distinctively bow-shaped (curved) arches.

It linked Bow in Middlesex with Stratford and West Ham in Essex. The name has also been applied to replacement structures, with the current structure also and more commonly known as Bow Flyover.

The Roman Road from Aldgate to Essex and East Anglia had previously forded the Lea further north, 0.5 miles (800 m) upstream, at Old Ford; the new crossing led the highway to take a more southerly route. The road is known by various names throughout its length, for instance Bow Road (in Bow) and High Street and Romford Road in Stratford, and the whole road was long known as the Great Essex Road.

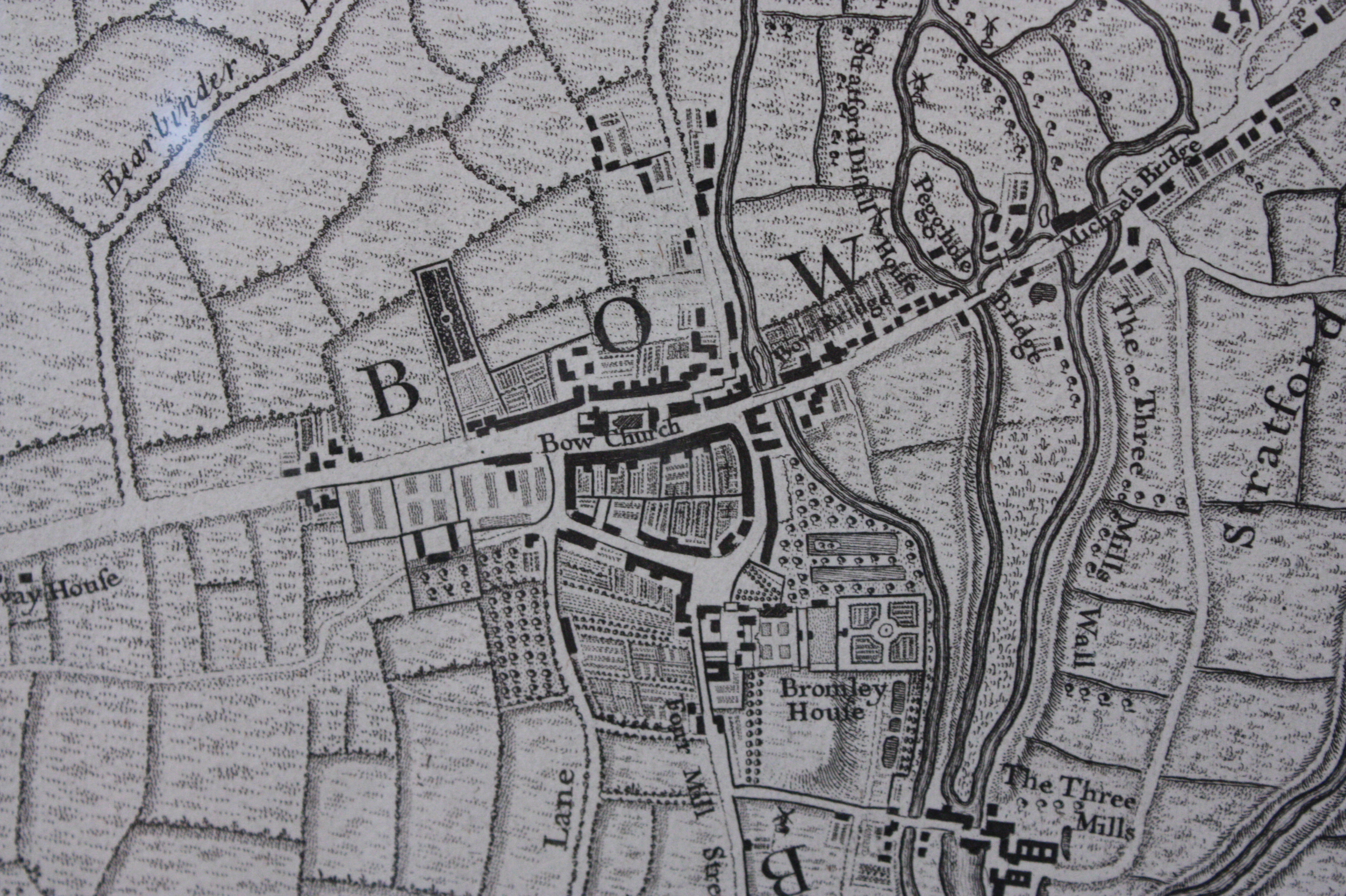
Bow Bridge as shown on John Rocque's 1747 map of London

Prior to the construction of the first bridge, settlements on both sides of the river were known as Stratford. Afterwards, the western Stratford settlement become suffixed by “-atte-Bow” (at the Bow), eventually becoming known simply as Bow. The eastern Stratford became suffixed by "Langthorne" after a large and notable tree but lost that suffix over time and is now known simply as Stratford.

There was a battle at Bow Bridge, on 4th June 1648, during the Wars of the Three Kingdoms.

== Origin ==
In 1110 Matilda, wife of Henry I, attempted to cross the Lea to get to Barking Abbey. The Queen (or some of her retinue) fell into the water while fording the Lea, a dangerous situation, especially with the heavy clothes worn by many women of the era.

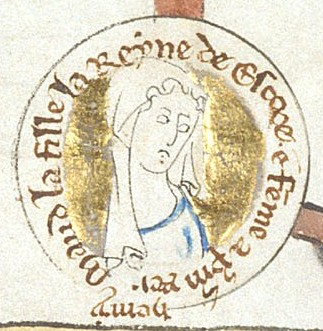
Matilda, builder of Bow Bridge and the other Stratford Causeway bridges

=== Building ===
As a result of the incident, Matilda ordered a distinctively bow-shaped (arched) bridge to be built over the River Lea, on which stood a chapel dedicated to St Katherine. The bridge was built in what was then an agricultural area, 3 miles (4.8 km) east of the Aldgate on London's city wall. The bridge was accompanied by four smaller bridges over the associated Bow Back Rivers. These were to be linked by a new stretch of road on a raised causeway along the line now occupied by Stratford High Street.

The five bridges, from west to east, were:

- Bow Bridge, the largest, crossing the main channel of the Lea.
- St Michael's Bridge (also known as Harrow Bridge), over the western branch of the Waterworks River.
- Pegshole Bridge, over the eastern branch of the waterworks River.
- St Thomas of Acre's Bridge (often abbreviated to St Thomas's Bridge), over the Three Mills Back River.
- Channelsea Bridge, the second largest, crossing the Channelsea River.

During the 19th century, confusion over the ownership of Pegshole and St Thomas Bridge led to the name of the two to be transposed

=== Maintenance ===
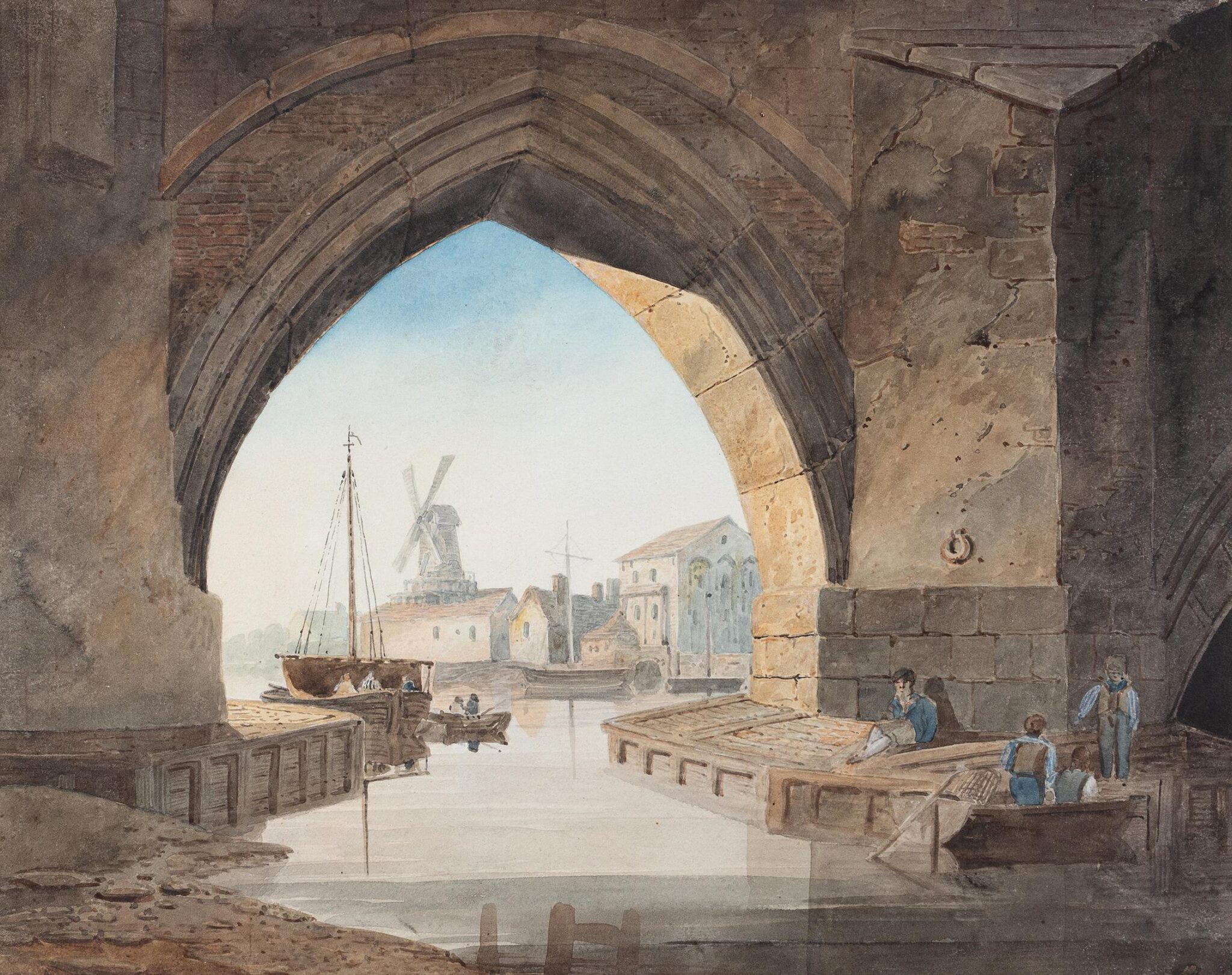
Painting by Frederick Mackenzie, circa 1810, identified as Bow Bridge by Ralph Hide of the Guildhall Library

Initially, local land and Abbey Mill were given to Barking Abbey for the maintenance of the bridge, but these properties and the responsibility eventually passed to Stratford Langthorne Abbey. The Abbess of Barking and Abbot of West Ham (i.e. Stratford Langthorne Abbey) argued about the obligation, a dispute that was settled in 1315. West Ham was to maintain the bridge and highway, but the Abbess would pay £200 annually in recompense. The Abbey's subsequent dissolution caused further lengthy litigation over maintenance of the bridge at Bow – with the successor landowners found responsible in 1691. The matter was not finally resolved until 1834, with the formation of a Turnpike Trust.

== In song ==
Various versions of the nursery rhyme London Bridge Is Falling Down make reference to Bow Bridge. The oldest known version could be that recalled by a correspondent to the Gentleman's Magazine in 1823, which he claimed to have heard from a woman who was a child in the reign of Charles II (r. 1660–1685) and had the lyrics:

London Bridge is broken down,
Dance over the Lady Lea;
London Bridge is broken down,
With a gay lay-dee.

There are a number of theories about the identity of the gay lady, fair lady, or Lady Lee/Lea of the rhyme; including the idea that it may refer to Matilda, the builder of Bow Bridge and its neighbours, or that it may apply to the River Lea itself.

== In literature ==
In 1724, Daniel Defoe began publication of his account, A Tour thro' the Whole Island of Great Britain, of his travels around Britain. He begins his tour in Essex, starting with the crossing of the Lea at Bow Bridge:

Passing Bow-Bridge, where the county of Essex begins, the first observation I made was, that all the villages which may be called the neighbourhood of the city of London on this, as well as on the other sides thereof, which I shall speak to in their order; I say, all those villages are increased in buildings to a strange degree, within the compass of about 20 or 30 years past at the most.

— Daniel Defoe, A Tour thro' the Whole Island of Great Britain 1724,

== Strategic position ==
The bridge was formerly the lowest crossing of what was once a much wilder, river that formed a much greater barrier to the east-west movement of trade and of armies. The Essex forces of the Peasants Revolt passed over the bridge in 1381, while Essex supporters of the Lancastrian cause passed over in 1471 during the Wars of the Roses. They would take part in an unsuccessful assault on Aldgate, Bishopsgate and London's defensive wall during an action known as the Siege of London.

== Battle of Bow Bridge ==
=== Background ===
The Battle of Naseby in June 1645 effectively ended Royalist hopes of victory in the First English Civil War, but the war continued with further Parliamentary success leading King Charles I to surrender to the Scots army besieging Newark in May 1646. He surrendered to his Scots enemies, rather than his English enemies in the hope of dividing his opponents. Essex, London and the eastern counties backed Parliament in the First English Civil War, but by 1648, this loyalty was stretched.

Anticipating an invasion by a Scots army from the north, in support of the King, there were a series of largely unco-ordinated Royalist risings in parts of the Royal Navy, South Wales, Lancashire, Essex and perhaps most seriously in Kent.

=== Prelude ===
A Parliamentary force quickly moved on Maidstone and captured it after bitter street fighting on 1 June. Despite this, a large Kentish Royalist force under the Earl of Norwich were able to make for London in the hope the city would rise up in their favour, indeed some Londoners had rioted in the King's favour a month prior. Disheartened by the loss of Maidstone there were many desertions and the force was reduced to around 3,000 men by the time it reached Greenwich at noon on 3 June 1648, after an all-night march.

There were few parliamentarian forces left in London, but under the energetic leadership of Philip Skippon, they closed the City gates and the also the fortified London Bridge. Most of the Royalists gave up at this point and core of around 500 infantry and some horsemen remained. The Earl of Norwich received word that around 2,000 Royalists had assembled at Bow Bridge with more at Chelmsford, so he crossed the river, with just his horse, in order to investigate the veracity of the information in order that the army could cross the Thames to rendez-vous with the other Royalists if the information was correct Sir William Compton was left in charge of the force at Greenwich. Norwich found no force at Bow Bridge so moved onto Chelmsford to seek a friendly army there.

When Norwich didn't return immediately from Bow Bridge, the Kentish force decided to cross the river, and landed on the east side of the Isle of Dogs peninsula, many at Blackwall.

=== Engagements ===
The Royalists had mistakenly believed they were in Essex - an area they believed lightly defended or perhaps friendly - rather than the hostile Tower Hamlets of Middlesex; until the Yellow (auxiliary) regiment (or elements of it) of the much respected Tower Hamlets Militia arrived to confronted the Royalists. The Royalists, who had landed in disorder were in no position to resist. The leader of the Militia decided to avoid bloodshed and told the Royalists that they would be escorted to Bow Bridge, on the border of the Tower Hamlets district, disarmed and sent on their way.

Before reaching the bridge, the Royalists had formed into much better order and were able to intimidate the handful of Essex musketeers on the bridge into letting them pass without giving up their arms; they were also able to take the major leading the Militia, and one other Tower Hamlets officer as hostages (releasing them on safely crossing the bridge). Shortly after crossing they met the Earl of Norwich and a force of Royalist cavalry, while a force of Parliamentarian horseman from Whalley's Regiment of Horse (Note: Possibly based around Bishopsgate. Elements of the Regiment would take part in the Bishopsgate mutiny there, the following year.) arrived on the Bow side of the bridge at about the same time.

The Earl of Norwich took two squadrons of cavalry (perhaps forty men) and immediately charged the parliamentarian cavalry, some of whom were killed, and the rest retreated. Norwich pursued them in the direction of the Aldgate on London's city wall, but the ran into an ambush. Parliamentarian dragoons were hiding behind hedges beside the road at Mile End Green, and they released a volley of fire at the Royalists, killing one. The Royalist force was within a mile and a half of the Aldgate, and closer still to the extra-mural suburb of Whitechapel. This was the closest to London that any Royalist force would come during the civil wars.

The Royalists retreated back to Bow Bridge, while Whalley's Regiment of Horse and the accompanying dragoons (mounted gunmen) rushed back to London to raise the alarm.

Nearing Bow Bridge, the cavalry (probably aided by their infantry), forced the Tower Hamlets Militia (or part of it) to seek refuge in Bow Church, and to then submit to the Royalists. About two hours are said to have passed between the initial capitulation of the Royalist landing force, and the capitulation of the Parliamentarias at Bow Church.

=== Aftermath ===
The Royalists stayed in Stratford for several days. They carefully guarded Bow Bridge and potential local fording points so that the Lea could guard their flank against attack from the City of London and the Tower Hamlets. The Earl of Norwich used the time to travel round nearer parts of Essex, trying to rally support among the gentry. Although the Royalist march on London was a failure, the ability of the remnant of that force to link up with Essex Royalists, and proceed to Colchester makes the fight at Bow Bridge a tactical victory for the Royalists.

The Royalists the marched off towards Royalist held Colchester, bolstered by local supporters who joined them en route, but a Parliamentarian force caught up with them just as they were about to enter the city's medieval walls, a bitter battle was fought but the Royalists were able to retire to the security of the city walls. The Siege of Colchester followed, but after ten weeks starvation and news of Royalist defeats elsewhere led the Royalists to surrender.

== Demolition and replacement ==
The bridge was widened in 1741 and tolls were levied to defray the expense, but litigation over maintenance lasted until 1834, when the bridge needed to be rebuilt and landowners agreed to pay half of the cost, with Essex and Middlesex sharing the other. The bridge was again replaced in 1834, by the Middlesex and Essex Turnpike Trust, and in 1866 West Ham took responsibility for its upkeep and that of the causeway and smaller bridges that continued the route across the Lea.

In 1967 that bridge was replaced by a new modern bridge by the Greater London Council who also installed a two-lane flyover above it (designed by Andrei Tchernavin, son of Gulag escapee Vladimir V. Tchernavin) spanning the Blackwall Tunnel approach road, the traffic interchange, the River Lea and some of the Bow Back Rivers. This has since been expanded to a four-lane road.

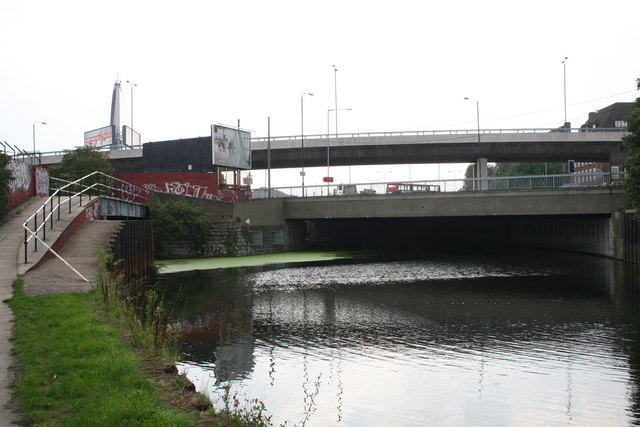
The current Bow Bridge, including the high-level Bow Flyover
