= Sledd of Essex =

6th-century king of Essex

Sledd (or Sledda) was King of Essex in the late 6th century, possibly between (?) 587 and c. 604. Extremely little is known about him.

An East-Saxon genealogy preserved as British Library Add. MS 23211, possibly of the late 9th century, makes him a son and successor of King Æscwine. The post-Conquest historians Henry of Huntingdon (Historia Anglorum), Roger of Wendover (Flores Historiarum), and Matthew Paris (Chronica Majora) substitute the name Eorcenwine (Erkenwine, Erchenwine) as his father. Though their testimony is centuries removed from Sledd's floruit, it is thought that they drew on alternative pre-Conquest material.

Although Æscwine or Eorcenwine is sometimes credited with the foundation of the kingdom, genealogies included in the works of William of Malmesbury and John of Worcester (Chronicon B) make Sledd the first king of Essex, while the genealogies in Add. MS 23211 use Sledd as their point of convergence. This suggests that Sledd may have been regarded as the founder of the East Saxon house. On no known authority, Roger of Wendover and Matthew Paris state that Sledd directly succeeded his father on his death in 587.

Sledd married Ricula, sister of King Æthelberht of Kent. Sledd was father of Sæberht, whose rule began in c. 604, and of another son, Seaxa, whose descendants supplanted those of Sæberht in the mid-8th century. Seaxa is perhaps identical to Seaxbald, father of king Swithelm, of unknown placement within the royal family, but Yorke thinks this unlikely on chronological grounds.

Preceded by Æscwine	King of Essex; 587? – c. 604	Succeeded by Sæberht
