= Æscwine of Essex =

6th-century king of Essex, possibly apocryphal

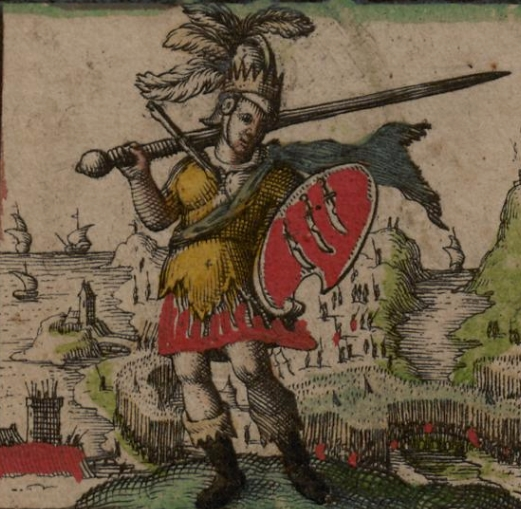
Imaginary depiction of Æscwine from John Speed's 1611 Saxon Heptarchy.

Æscwine or Erkenwine (died 587) is listed in some Anglo-Saxon royal genealogies as the first king of Essex and father of Sledd. Most sources list Sledd as the first king and Æscwine's existence is uncertain.

== Background ==
Little evidence is available for his existence. His name Æscwine first appears in an East-Saxon genealogy which is imperfectly preserved in British Library Add. MS 23211, presumably of the late 9th century. Here he is said to be father to King Sledd and himself a son of Offa, son of Bedca, son of Sigefugl, son of Swæppa, son of Antsecg, son of Gesecg, son of Seaxnet (euhemerized god of the Saxons), whom the later genealogies make son of Woden.

Further information is supplied by works of historians writing in the 12th and 13th centuries, who appear to have used pre-Conquest material, viz., Henry of Huntingdon's Historia Anglorum, Roger of Wendover's Flores Historiarum and Matthew Paris's Chronica Majora. These, however, substitute the name Æscwine with Erkenwine or Erchenwine as Sledd's father. Both these names seem to betray Kentish connections. On no known authority, Roger of Wendover and Matthew Paris state that Erkenwine founded the kingdom in 527 and reigned from that year to 587, when he died and was succeeded by his son Sledd. The reputed length of his reign appears unlikely for the time. Alternatively, genealogies included in the works of William of Malmesbury and John of Worcester make Sledd the first king of Essex and genealogies for later kings Offa, Sigered and Swithred in Add. MS 23211 converge on Sledd.

According to tradition, he is remembered for having rebelled against Octa, King of Kent, he defeated him in battle in 527 at a site near modern-day Millfields in Hackney, establishing the Kingdom of Essex.

== Sources ==
- Yorke, Barbara (1985). "The Kingdom of the East Saxons". Anglo-Saxon England. 14: 1–36. doi:10.1017/S0263675100001253.

Preceded by —	King of Essex	Succeeded by Sledd
