= Frederick Mackenzie (painter) =

British painter

Frederick Mackenzie (1787–1854) was a British watercolourist and architectural draughtsman.

== Life ==
Born in London on 6 April 1787, he was the son of Thomas Mackenzie, linendraper and his wife Lucy. A pupil of John Adey Repton the architect. He was employed in making architectural and topographical drawings for the works of John Britton and others, and this set the direction for his career. His style was quite close to that of Auguste Pugin, with whom he worked; and they were both under the influence of John Nash.

In 1804 Mackenzie began to exhibit at the Royal Academy, and contributed eleven drawings between that year and 1828. He contributed to the Society of Painters in Water-colours from 1813, becoming an associate in 1822, and a full member the following year. From 30 November 1831 till his death he was treasurer to the society. In later life Mackenzie was no longer commissioned to illustrate books.

He died on 25 April 1854, aged 67, of disease of the heart and was buried on the western side of Highgate Cemetery. His grave (no.1007) no longer has a headstone or any memorial. His remaining works were sold at Sotheby's in March 1855.

== Works ==
Mackenzie drew architecture almost exclusively. Of 88 drawings which formed his contributions to the exhibitions of the Water-colour Society during his membership, nearly all were English in subject.

On his own account, Mackenzie published Etchings of Landscapes for the Use of Students (1812), Architectural Antiquities of St. Stephen's Chapel, Westminster (1844) and in 1846 Observations on the Construction of the Roof of King's College Chapel, Cambridge. The bulk of his work was in the following books:

- Britton's Beauties of England and Wales;
- Architectural Antiquities of Great Britain (1807 and 1809—twenty-five drawings engraved);
- History of the Abbey Church at Westminster (Ackerman, 1812—32 coloured aquatints);
- Britton's Cathedral Antiquities (Salisbury Cathedral—58 plates);
- Robert Havell's Noblemen's and Gentlemen's Seats (drawings dated 1816 and 1819);
- Histories of Oxford and Cambridge (Ackerman, 1814 and 1815—39 plates);
- Colleges of Winchester, Eton, etc., 1816 (13 plates);
- Abbeys and Castles in Yorkshire (with William Westall);
- Pugin's Specimens of Gothic Architecture, 1821;
- Principal Antiquities of Oxfordshire, Oxford, 1823;
- Memorials of Oxford, by James Ingram, 1837 (100 plates);
- Charles Heath's Picturesque Annual, 1839 (six plates);
- Memorials of Cambridge, by Thomas Wright and Harry Longueville Jones, 1841;
- The Churches of London, published by Charles Tilt (drawings dated 1837–9).

Among his drawings were The King's Coronation (1822) and The Principal Room of the Original National Gallery, formerly the Residence of John Julius Angerstein, Esq., lately pulled down. The latter was contributed to the Water-colour Society's exhibition in 1836, and went to the South Kensington Museum, together with two drawings of Lincoln Cathedral and one of Thornton Abbey, Lincolnshire. sepia drawing of Antwerp Cathedral went to the British Museum.

In 1842 Mackenzie designed the slab which was placed over the grave of George Barret the younger.

== Family ==
Mackenzie married in Lambeth in 1843 Mrs. Mary Hine, a widow, the daughter of John Carpenter, a farmer; but his married life was subject to money troubles. He died leaving his wife and invalid daughter dependent on charity. The Water-colour Society presented them with £110, and a subscription was raised among his friends to purchase an annuity for their benefit.

== Gallery ==
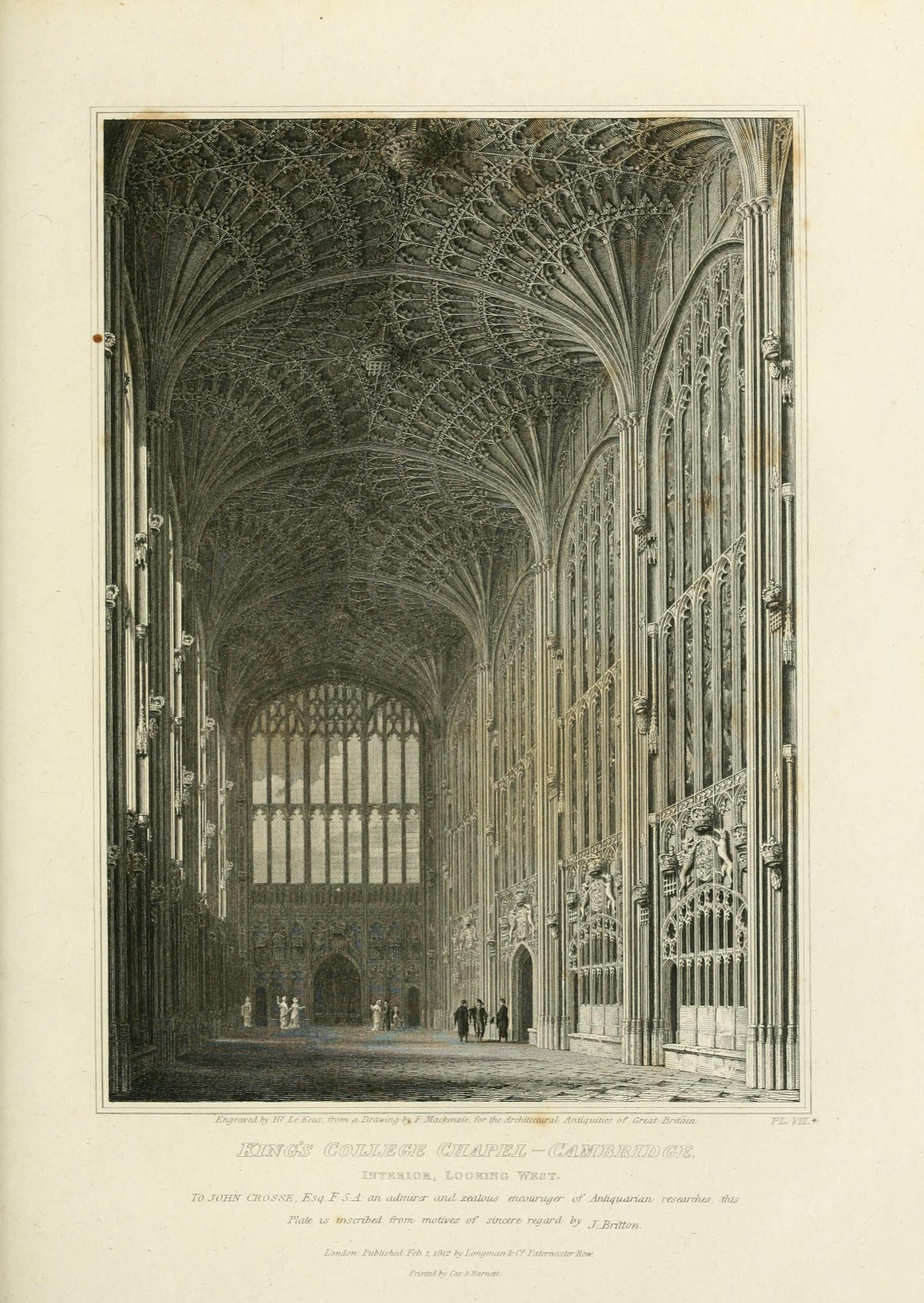
Interior of King's College Chapel after Frederick Mackenzie, from Britton's Architectural Antiquities, 1812

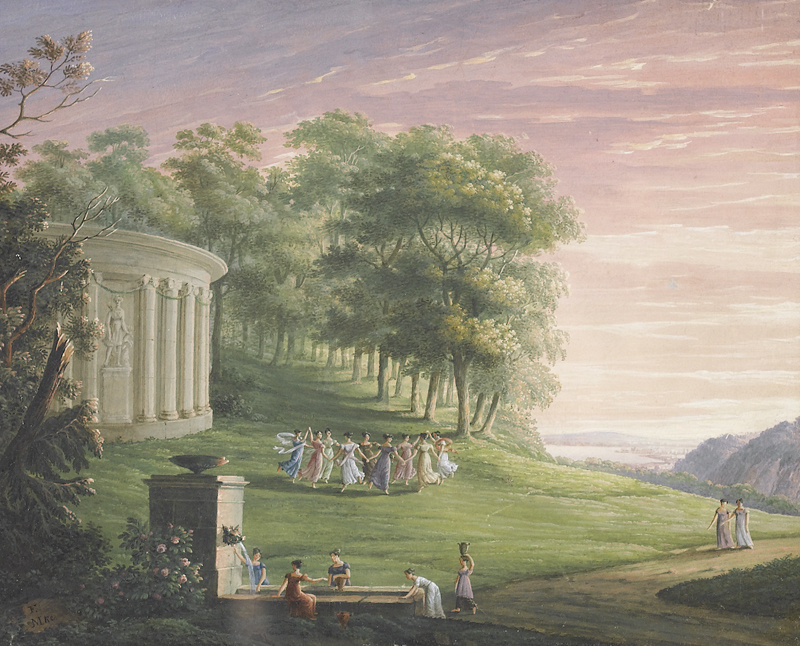
English park idyll with dancing women. Gouache, monogrammed

== Notes ==
Attribution

This article incorporates text from a publication now in the public domain: Lee, Sidney, ed. (1893). "Mackenzie, Frederick". Dictionary of National Biography. Vol. 35. London: Smith, Elder & Co.
