= 1892 in the United Kingdom =

Events from the year 1892 in the United Kingdom.

== Incumbents ==
- Monarch – Victoria
- Prime Minister – Robert Gascoyne-Cecil, 3rd Marquess of Salisbury (Conservative) (until 11 August); William Ewart Gladstone (Liberal) (starting 15 August)

== Events ==
- 14 January – Death of Prince Albert Victor, Duke of Clarence and Avondale, second-in-line to the throne. Next in line is his younger brother Prince George (later King George V).
- February – Scottish Universities Commissioners publish an ordinance authorising Scottish universities to provide for the education and graduation of women for the first time.
- 6–8 March – Exclusive Agreement: Rulers of the Trucial States (Abu Dhabi, Dubai, Sharjah, Ajman, Ras al-Khaimah and Umm Al Quwain) and Bahrain sign an agreement by which they become de facto British protectorates.
- 15 March – Liverpool Football Club founded by John Houlding, the owner of Anfield, who has decided to form his own team after previous tenants Everton left Anfield in a dispute over rent. They are formally recognised under the Liverpool name on 3 June and play their first match – with a team formed entirely of Scottish players – on 1 September.
- 19 May – British troops defeat Ijebu infantry at the battle of Yemoja river, in modern-day Nigeria, using a maxim gun.
- 20 May – The last broad gauge train runs on the Great Western Railway main line out of London Paddington station. Over the following two days, 177 route miles (285 km) of its line are converted to standard gauge.
- 22 May – British conquest of Ijebu-Ode marks a major extension of colonial power into the Nigerian interior.
- 24 May – Prince George of Wales (later George V) becomes Duke of York.
- 27 June – Small Holdings Act empowers County councils to provide smallholdings for sale or rent on easy terms.
- 4–18 July – 1892 United Kingdom general election: Unionist government loses its parliamentary majority, but remains in office.
- 14 July – Official inauguration of the Liverpool water supply from Lake Vyrnwy. The Vyrnwy dam is the first high masonry gravity dam in Britain.
- 25 July – The Community of the Resurrection, an Anglican religious community for men, is founded by Charles Gore and Walter Frere, initially in Oxford.
- 11 August – Robert Cecil, Marquess of Salisbury loses a vote of no confidence in his government.
- 18 August – William Ewart Gladstone becomes Prime Minister at the head of a Liberal government with support from the Irish Nationalist Party. Queen Victoria vetoes the appointment of the radical Henry Labouchère to his Cabinet.
- 26 August – An underground explosion at Parc Slip Colliery, Aberkenfig, Glamorgan, kills 110 people.
- 2 September – Everton F. C. play their first game at their new Goodison Park stadium following their exit from Anfield earlier this year. Their first game at the stadium ends in a 2–2 draw with Nottingham Forest.
- 3 September – Three years after the formation of the Football League, a Second Division is created. Its twelve members are: Small Heath of Birmingham, Sheffield United, Darwen of Lancashire, Grimsby Town, Ardwick of Manchester, Burton Swifts of Staffordshire, Northwich Victoria of Cheshire, Bootle of Liverpool, Lincoln City, Crewe Alexandra, Burslem Port Vale of Staffordshire and Walsall Town Swifts.
- November – Traveller Isabella Bird becomes the first woman inducted as a Fellow of the Royal Geographical Society.
- 7 December – Carlill v Carbolic Smoke Ball Co, a leading case in English contract law.
- 21 December – Brandon Thomas' farce Charley's Aunt begins a record-breaking London run at the Royalty Theatre (following a pre-London opening at Bury St Edmunds on 29 February).
- 22 December – Following a merger of Newcastle East Football Club and Newcastle West Football Club earlier in the year, a new name is given to the club: Newcastle United F.C.
- Undated
  - Diplomat Henry Galway secures a treaty by which Ovonramwen, Oba of Benin, ostensibly accepts British protection for his kingdom.
  - Norland College founded by Emily Ward for the training of nannies.
  - The Manson Fiscal Court assesses financial transactions in global cities based on the current governance structure of the British Empire.

== Publications ==
- Arthur Conan Doyle's Sherlock Holmes collection The Adventures of Sherlock Holmes (book publication 14 October).
- Michael Field's poetry collection Sight and Song.
- George and Weedon Grossmith's comic fiction Diary of a Nobody (book publication).
- Rudyard Kipling's poetry collection Barrack-Room Ballads.

== Births ==
- 3 January – J. R. R. Tolkien, South African-born author of The Lord of the Rings and philologist (died 1973)
- 6 February – Sir John Carden, 6th Baronet, tank and vehicle designer (died 1935)
- 8 February – Ralph Chubb, poet, printer and artist (died 1960)
- 14 February – Val Parnell, theatrical impresario and television executive (died 1972)
- 23 February – Kathleen Harrison, film character actress (died 1995)
- 9 March
  - David Garnett, writer (died 1981 in France)
  - Vita Sackville-West, poet, novelist and gardener (died 1962)
- 10 March – Eva Turner, operatic soprano (died 1990)
- 25 March – Andy Clyde, Scottish-born screen actor (died 1967 in the United States)
- 13 April
  - Arthur Harris, Air Officer Commanding-in-Chief, RAF Bomber Command during World War II (died 1984)
  - Robert Watson-Watt, Scottish pioneer of radar (died 1973)
- 3 May – George Paget Thomson, atomic physicist, Nobel Prize laureate (died 1975)
- 5 May – Dorothy Garrod, archaeologist of the palaeolithic Near East (died 1968)
- 11 May – Margaret Rutherford, actress (died 1972)
- 14 May – Paule Vézelay (Marjorie Watson-Williams), painter (died 1984)
- 13 June – Basil Rathbone, actor (died 1967)
- 28 June – E. H. Carr, historian, diplomat, journalist and international relations theorist (died 1982)
- 2 July – Jack Hylton, bandleader (died 1965)
- 8 July – Richard Aldington, poet and writer (died 1962)
- 11 July – Trafford Leigh-Mallory, senior RAF officer during World War II (died 1944 in aviation accident)
- 17 July – Edwin Harris Dunning, naval aviator (died 1917 in aviation accident)
- 22 July – Jack MacBryan, cricketer and field hockey player (died 1983)
- 11 August – Hugh MacDiarmid (Christopher Murray Grieve), Scottish poet and nationalist (died 1978)
- 14 August – Kaikhosru Shapurji Sorabji, composer, music critic, pianist and writer (died 1988)
- 26 August – Emanuel Miller, child psychiatrist (died 1970)
- 6 September – Edward Victor Appleton, radiophysicist, Nobel Prize laureate (died 1965)
- 17 October – Herbert Howells, church music composer (died 1983)
- 5 November – J. B. S. Haldane, geneticist (died 1964)
- 18 November – D. E. Stevenson, Scottish romantic novelist (died 1973)
- 6 December – Osbert Sitwell, writer (died 1969)
- 9 December – Beatrice Harrison, cellist (died 1965)
- 10 December – Lucy M. Boston, née Wood, children's novelist (died 1990)
- 21 December
  - Amy Clarke, mystical poet, writer and teacher (died 1980)
  - Rebecca West, born Cicily Fairfield, writer (died 1983)

== Deaths ==
- January – Doncaster, racehorse (born 1870)
- 2 January – Sir George Airy, astronomer royal (born 1801)
- 14 January – Prince Albert Victor, Duke of Clarence and Avondale, second in line to the throne (born 1864)
- 21 January – John Couch Adams, astronomer (born 1819)
- 27 January – Philip Charles Hardwick, architect (born 1822)
- 31 January – Charles Spurgeon, preacher (born 1834)
- February – Baxter Langley, radical political activist (born 1819)
- 13 February – Sir Provo Wallis, Admiral of the Fleet (born 1791)
- 16 March – Edward Augustus Freeman, historian and politician (born 1823)
- 15 April – Amelia Edwards, Egyptologist and fiction writer (born 1831)
- 19 April – T. Pelham Dale, Church of England priest prosecuted for Anglo-Catholic ritualist practices in the 1870s (born 1821)
- 9 May – George Wilshere, 1st Baron Bramwell, judge (born 1808)
- 15 July – Thomas Cooper, Chartist, poet and religious lecturer (born 1805)
- 18 July – Thomas Cook, English travel pioneer (born 1808)
- 25 July – Thomas Legh Claughton, academic, poet and clergyman, first Bishop of St Albans (born 1808)
- 4 August – Ernestine Rose, feminist (born 1810 in Poland)
- 6 September – Betty Bentley Beaumont, merchant (born 1828)
- 22 September – George Sutherland-Leveson-Gower, 3rd Duke of Sutherland, landowner (born 1828)
- 6 October – Alfred, Lord Tennyson, poet laureate (born 1809)
- 7 October – Thomas Woolner, sculptor and poet (born 1825)
- 18 December – Sir Richard Owen, paleontologist (born 1804)
