= Elephants and Bees =

African organization

- Founded: 2006
- Founder: Iain Douglas-Hamilton

Elephants and Bees is an organization that uses African bees to reduce the problem of elephants destroying crops on small farms in Africa and Asia.

== Method ==
A fence of beehives is built around a farm. The beehives are connected to each other with strong wires. If an elephant approaches the fence and bumps the wire, the bee hives are shaken, and the bees swarm to attack the threat. Although the elephant hide is very thick, bees can deliver significant pain by attacking vulnerable areas such as ears, eyes, and trunks. Furthermore, when an African bee stings an elephant, it might release a pheromone that encourages additional bees to focus on that victim.

Once elephants have been attacked by bees, they remember the experience, and pass that information to other members of the herd, and so when they approach the farm, the noise from the beehives can be sufficient to cause the elephants to retreat.

In addition to keeping elephants from destroying the crops, the beehives provide pollination for the crops, as well as a source of honey, which the farmers can eat or sell.

== History ==
The organization was started by Iain Douglas-Hamilton in 2006 by Save the Elephants to test methods to reduce elephant-human conflicts. Additional funding was provided by Disney Conservation Fund. In 2013, the project won the $100,000 St Andrews Prize for the Environment.
