= Southend Central Museum =

Museum in Southend-on-Sea, England

Central Museum, Southend
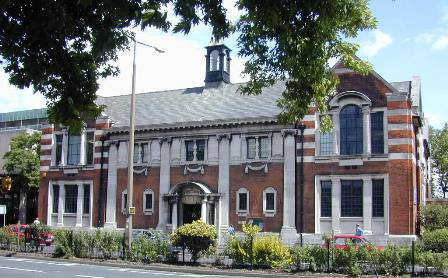
- Central Museum, Southend

- Museum location in Essex
- Established: 1981
- Location: Southend-on-Sea, Essex
- Coordinates: 51.5422°N 0.7106°E
- Type: Local history
- Key holdings: Prittlewell Anglo-Saxon burial; The London shipwreck
- Collections: Costume, fine art, local history, natural history, archaeology
- Architect: Henry Thomas Hare
- Owner: Southend-on-Sea City Council - Southend Museums
- Public transit access: Southend Victoria
- Website: www.southendmuseums.co.uk

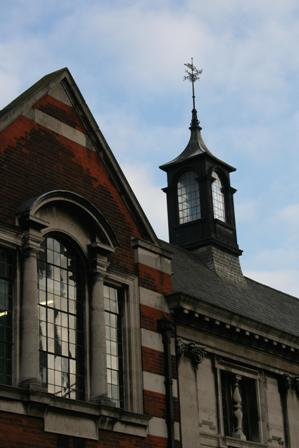
A close up of the Central Museum, Southend

Southend Central Museum is a museum in Southend-on-Sea, Essex, England. The museum houses collections of local and natural history and contains a planetarium constructed by astronomer Harry Ford in 1984.

The museum was opened in April 1981 in a Grade II listed building that was previously Southend's first free public library. The library service had moved to a new purpose built site on Victoria Avenue, which opened on 20 March 1974.

== The building ==
The Museum was originally built in 1905 as a free library, with £8,000 of funding from Andrew Carnegie. The architect was Henry Thomas Hare. The building was listed in 1974.

== The collections ==
The museum features a collection of original Ekco radios, manufactured by E.K. Cole & Co. Ltd. (or 'Ekco') formerly based in Southend. In the 1930s, this company was one of Britain's largest radio manufacturers.

The displays also include local and natural history and archaeology.

In September 2018 the museum opened a major exhibition of finds recovered from the wreck of HMS London, a 17th century Cromwellian era warship that exploded and sank in the Thames Estuary in 1665. The exhibition ran till July 2019.

In May 2019 a new gallery opened to display the archaeological finds from the Royal Saxon tomb in Prittlewell, an Anglo-Saxon burial mound in the suburb of Prittlewell that was discovered in 2003 as a result of a road-widening scheme. The excavations unearthed a number of Anglo-Saxon artefacts that suggested a high-status burial; carbon dating has revealed that the burial probably dates from about 580 AD, and may have been the tomb of Sæxa, brother of Sæberht, King of Essex.

== Additional photographs ==
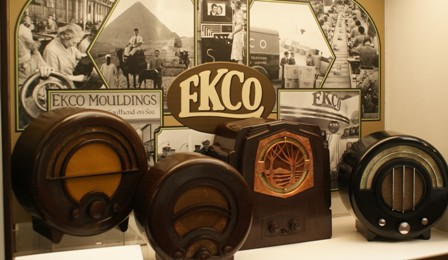
Collection of Ekco radios on show at the Central Museum

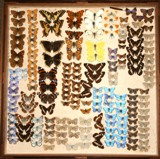
Butterflies from the reserve natural history collections of Southend Museums Service
