= English ship London (1656) =

HMS London (1656), 76-gun second-rate ship of the line

- Artistic impression of the wreck of London shortly after she sank. All the parts of the ship shown here above the seabed had gone when the wreck was rediscovered.

History

England
- Name: London
- Ordered: 3 July 1654
- Builder: Captain John Taylor, Chatham Dockyard
- Launched: June 1656
- Fate: Accidentally blown up, 7 March 1665

General characteristics
- Class & type: 76-gun second-rate ship of the line
- Tons burthen: 1,0516/94 bm originally, 1,10436/94 after girdling
- Length: 123 ft 6 in (37.6 m) (keel)
- Beam: 40 ft 0 in (12 m) originally, 41 ft 0 in (12 m) (after girdling)
- Depth of hold: 16 ft 6 in (5.0 m)
- Sail plan: Full-rigged ship
- Complement: 360 men in 1660; 450 men in 1665
- Armament: 64 guns in 1660; 76 guns in 1665

London was a 76-gun second-rate ship of the line in the Navy of the Commonwealth of England, originally built at Chatham Dockyard by Master Shipwright Captain John Taylor, and launched in June 1656. She gained fame as one of the ships that escorted Charles II from Holland back to England during the English Restoration, carrying Charles' younger brother James Duke of York, and commanded by Captain John Lawson.

London was accidentally blown up in 1665 and sank in the Thames Estuary. According to Samuel Pepys 300 of her crew were killed, 24 were blown clear and survived, including one woman. Lawson was not aboard at the time of the explosion but many of his relatives were killed. The wreck is a Protected Wreck managed by Historic England.

== Active service ==
The London was one of four Second rates ordered by the Council of State on 3 July 1654 as part of the 1654 Construction Programme; she was launched from Chatham Dockyard in June 1656 (by Order of 19 June). She had 13 pairs of gunports on the lower deck (one pair unused), 12 pairs on the middle deck, and 10 pairs on the upper deck (3 pairs forward and 7 pairs aft of the waist, where she lacked gunports). She was first fitted with 64 guns, comprising 12 demi-cannon and 12 culverins on the lower deck, 12 culverins and 12 demi-culverins on the middle deck, and 16 more demi-culverins on the upper deck (which was only partially armed in the waist at that date); later additional guns were added on what became a fully-armed upper deck, and more additional guns on the quarterdeck.

She was commissioned in 1657 under the authority of Rear-Admiral Richard Stayner and first put to sea in 1658 under the command of Captain William Whitehorne as acting commander-in-chief of Commonwealth forces in The Downs. Stayner resumed direct command of London in 1659, remaining in The Downs.

In May 1660, on the Restoration of the English monarchy, the vessel passed bloodlessly into Royalist hands. The ship was part of the fleet, commanded by Stayner, that brought King Charles II back to England from his exile on the continent. The royal convoy left from Scheveningen on 23 May and landed in Dover on 26 May. While the king sailed on the flagship, Royal Charles, London carried his younger brother James, Duke of York, the future King James II, as her principal passenger.

Nominal command was vested in Captain and later Vice-Admiral John Lawson from 1660 to 1664. Thereafter, London was the flagship of Admiral Edward Montagu and directly commanded by flag-captain Jonas Poole.

The ship was lost on 7 March 1665. She had been briefly transferred back to John Lawson's command for the purpose of bringing her from Chatham to the Thames, when her powder magazine was accidentally ignited. The subsequent explosion caused immense damage, leaving little but wreckage on the surface of the river. On hearing of the loss, Samuel Pepys wrote on 8 March 1665 that:

This morning is brought me to the office the sad newes of the London, in which Sir J(ohn) Lawson’s men were all bringing her from Chatham to the Hope, and thence he was to go to sea in her; but a little a’this side the buoy of the Nower, she suddenly blew up. About 24 [men] and a woman that were in the round-house and coach saved; the rest, being above 300, drowned: the ship breaking all in pieces, with 80 pieces of brass ordnance. She lies sunk, with her round- house above water. Sir J(ohn) Lawson hath a great loss in this of so many good chosen men, and many relations among them. I went to the ‘Change, where the news taken very much to heart."

The precise cause of the explosion is unknown. Another letter, this time to Henry Bennet, 1st Earl of Arlington, passed on coffee-house gossip which blamed the easy availability of gunpowder ’20s a barrel cheaper than in London’ and therefore by implication suspect in provenance and quality. On 9 March, John Evelyn, the other famous diarist of the period, ‘went to receive the poor creatures that were saved out of the London frigate, blown up by accident, with above 200 men,’ for he had been appointed one of the Commissioners for sick and wounded seamen by Charles II.

On 11 March Pepys also recorded the results of an inspection of the wreck by Sir William Batten and Sir John Mennes: "out of which they say, the guns may be got, but the hull of her will be wholly lost." Those guns continued to be the focus of administrative attention for 30 years afterwards: recoveries made in 1679 caused controversy when the salvor attempted to leverage their return as payment of an unrelated debt.

== Rediscovery of wreck ==
The wreck of London was rediscovered in 2005, resulting in port authorities changing the route of the shipping channel to prevent further damage and to allow archaeologists from Wessex Archaeology led by Frank Pope to investigate. The site where the remains lie was designated under the Protection of Wrecks Act 1973 on 24 October 2008. The wreck is considered important partly for its historical references and partly for its insight into an important period in English naval history. Although the Port of London Authority had voluntarily taken action to reduce the risk of damage to shipping, the removal of bronze cannon from the site without any archaeological investigations being carried out showed that the site was at risk of destruction through looting and hence required immediate protection.

On 12 August 2015, a gun carriage was lifted from the seabed off Southend-on-Sea which was described by Historic England as being in near-perfect condition, and important to England's knowledge of its social and naval history. One of the cannons is on permanent display in the atrium of Southend Central Museum.

The wreck is at on-going risk of loss through erosion, so between 2014 and 2016 a licensed programme of surface recovery and limited excavations (funded by Historic England) took place, with around 700 small finds recovered, almost half of which were made of wood. A report on the wooden finds was published in 2019 as was a further report on copper alloy and tin alloy objects, which included an urethral syringe. Historic England also commissioned an updated Conservation Management Plan for the London protected wreck site in 2016, which was published in 2017.

An exhibition of finds recovered from the London including one of the cannons was held at Southend Central Museum between 22 September 2018 and 20 July 2019. New finds subsequently recovered from the wreck will be going on display in a new exhibition at Southend Central Museum in May 2025.

In September 2019 a German parachute mine from World War II was removed from the wreck.

London was featured in a 2025 episode of Digging for Britain (series 12, episode 1).

== Bibliography ==
- Lavery, Brian (1983) The Ship of the Line – Volume 1: The development of the battlefleet 1650–1850. Conway Maritime Press. ISBN 0-85177-252-8.
- Winfield, Rif (2009). British Warships in the Age of Sail 1603–1714: Design, Construction, Careers and Fates. Seaforth Publishing. ISBN 978-1-84832-040-6..
