= The Secret Life of Elephants =

- Region 2 DVD cover
- Genre: Nature documentary
- Narrated by: Sarah Parish
- Composers: David Poore; Abbie Lathe
- Country of origin: United Kingdom
- Original language: English
- No. of episodes: 3

Production
- Executive producer: Sara Ford
- Producers: Holly Spearing; Nigel Pope
- Production location: Kenya
- Running time: 60 minutes
- Production companies: BBC Natural History Unit; Animal Planet

Original release
- Network: BBC One
- Release: 14 January – 28 January 2009

The Secret Life of Elephants is a BBC nature documentary series following the lives of elephants and the work of the conservation charity Save the Elephants in Samburu National Reserve, Kenya. It was first transmitted in the United Kingdom on BBC One in January 2009 to 4.2 million viewers.

The three-part series follows the lives of African elephants in Samburu, Northern Kenya, focusing on the stories of individual elephants to show the most dramatic moments of their lives. Their hidden world is revealed, from the complexities of family life and their intelligence to the depth of their emotions. The series also follows the work of father and daughter Iain and Saba Douglas-Hamilton and their Save the Elephants team, which includes tracking elephants, fitting tracking collars and developing the relationship between humans and elephants.

== DVD ==
The series was released on DVD by BBC Worldwide on 9 February 2009.
