= Lord David Douglas-Hamilton =

Scottish boxer

Medal record

Men's Boxing

Representing Scotland

British Empire Games
Bronze medal – third place	1934 London	Heavyweight

Squadron Leader Lord David Douglas-Hamilton (8 November 1912 – 2 August 1944) was a Scottish nobleman, pilot, and amateur boxer. At the 1934 Empire Games, he won the bronze medal in the heavyweight class of the boxing tournament.

== Biography ==
Lord David was born at Dungavel House, Lanarkshire, the youngest son of Lt. Alfred Douglas-Hamilton, 13th Duke of Hamilton RN and his wife Nina, née Poore. He commanded No. 603 Squadron RAF from 18 December 1941 until 20 July 1942. He and his brothers – Air Commodore Douglas Douglas-Hamilton, 14th Duke of Hamilton, Group Captain George Douglas-Hamilton, 10th Earl of Selkirk, and Wing Commander Lord Malcolm Douglas-Hamilton – made history as the only four brothers simultaneously being at the rank of squadron leader or above at the outset of World War II

He was educated at Harrow, St. Andrew's University and Balliol College, Oxford. At Oxford he was captain of the university boxing team, and learned to fly with the University Air Squadron.

Douglas-Hamilton saw active service between 1939 and 1944, flying Spitfires in Operation Torch over Malta. On return to Britain, he was killed whilst carrying out reconnaissance over the French coast and crashed in southern England.

== Marriage and issue ==
On 15 October 1938, he married Ann Prunella Stack, a fitness pioneer and the leader of the Women's League for Health and Beauty. They had two sons:

- Diarmaid Douglas-Hamilton (1940–2023), an astrophysicist at Harvard University
- Iain Douglas-Hamilton (1942–2025), zoologist, father of television presenter Saba Douglas-Hamilton

== See also ==
- Douglas Douglas-Hamilton, 14th Duke of Hamilton
- George Nigel Douglas-Hamilton, 10th Earl of Selkirk
- Lord Malcolm Douglas-Hamilton
