= Beehive fence =

Elephant deterrent infrastructure

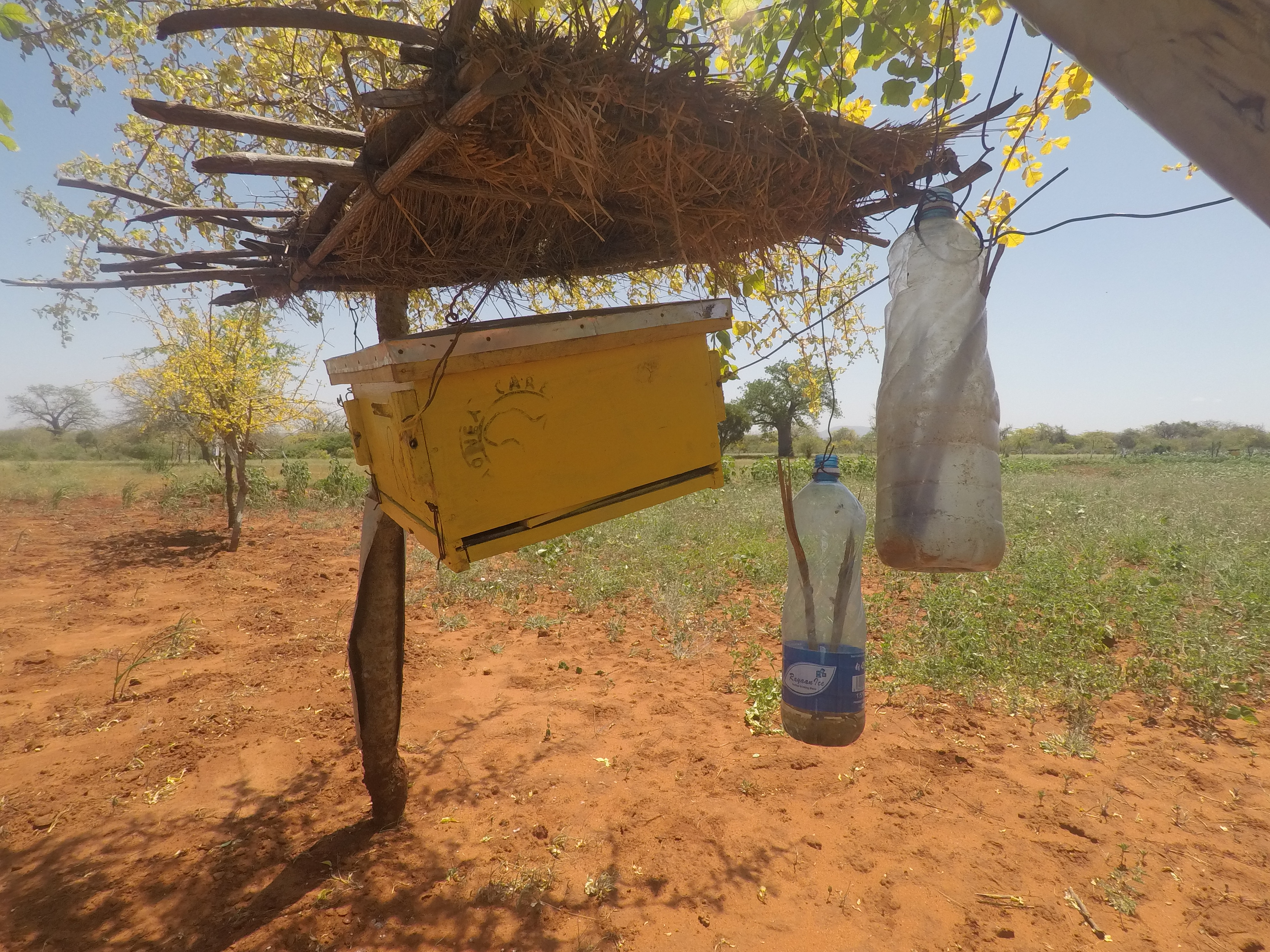
A hive as part of a beehive fence

A beehive fence is a fence which is built to deter elephants based on their natural fear of bees. The fence is set up off the ground at chest height and contains hives spaced every 10 metres (yards). If an elephant disturbs the fence, then the hives shake and the bees become agitated, and the elephants are deterred. Elephants communicate the presence of bees to other elephants and thus tend to avoid the area.

The approach has been largely successful, reducing conflict between humans and elephants by up to 85%. In addition to minimising conflicts between humans and elephants, the beehives can also serve as an additional source of income via the sale of the honey produced.

Beehive fences were invented by Lucy King, a zoologist at Save the Elephants, who noticed that elephants avoided acacia trees that had bee colonies. The inventor received the 2013 St. Andrews Prize for the Environment.

Like electric fences, beehive fences require maintenance. Criticisms of beehive fences include difficulties and costs involved in maintaining large colonies of bees, as well as the potential for ineffectiveness if there are too few bees or if the elephants knock over beehives while advancing. The species of bee used is also important, with one honeybee subspecies commonly kept in Asia believed to be less aggressive toward elephants. Work continues to refine approaches to optimize the design of the beehive fences for different regions.

== See also ==
- Elephants and Bees, an African organization that uses beehive fences
