= Frank Pope =

British television presenter and archaeologist

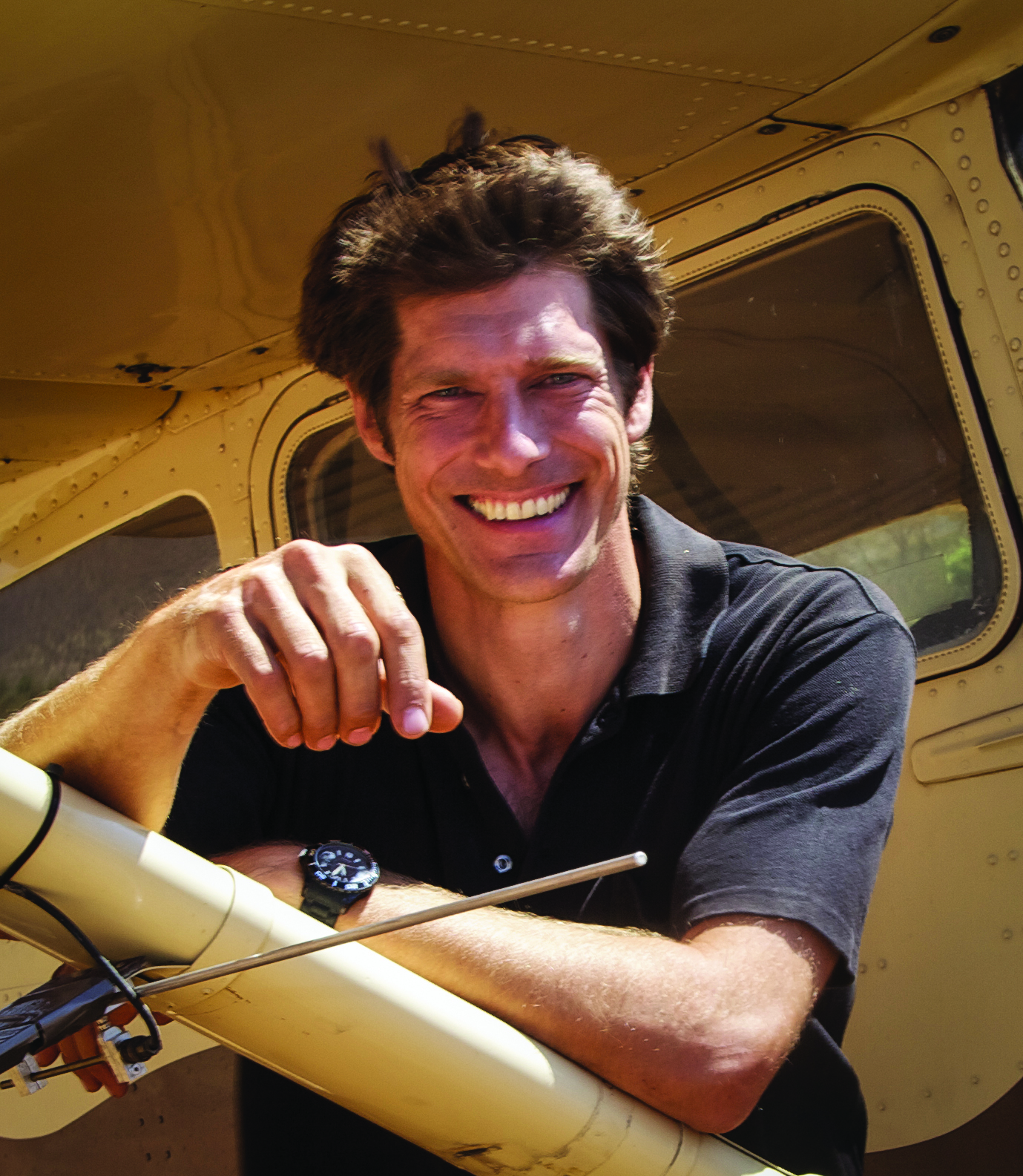
- Education: University of Edinburgh
- Occupation: Conservationist
- Title: Chief Executive Officer
- Spouse: Saba Douglas-Hamilton
- Children: 3
- Parent(s): Maurice Pope; Johanna Pope

Frank Pope is the chief executive officer for Save the Elephants (STE). After studying zoology at the University of Edinburgh he began his career in marine science before joining The Times newspaper as the world's first Ocean Correspondent (between 2008 and 2011). During this time, he published two books, Dragon Sea (Penguin, 2007) and 72 Hours (Orion, 2011) and hosted the BBC Series Britain's Secret Seas.

Pope joined Save the Elephants in 2012 and later helped establish the Elephant Crisis Fund (a joint initiative between Save the Elephants and the Wildlife Conservation Network), supporting more than 58 different partner organisations across Africa and the world in conducting projects in the realms of anti-poaching, anti-trafficking and demand reduction.

Pope is married to Saba Douglas-Hamilton, daughter of STE founder Iain Douglas-Hamilton. They live in Kenya with their three children. In 2015, they made the BBC Natural History Unit series This Wild Life.

== Maritime archaeology ==
Pope worked on maritime archaeological projects in Uruguay, Cape Verde Islands, Greece, Italy, Vietnam and Mozambique on wrecks including the San Salvador, Graf Spee off Montevideo and Lord Nelson's flagship HMS Agamemnon in Uruguay, Princess Louisa in Cabo Verde and the San Sebastian Wreck in Mozambique. In Vietnam, Pope worked on the Hoi An Wreck, the subject of his book, Dragon Sea: A True Tale of Treasure, Archeology, and Greed Off the Coast of Vietnam.
