= Prittlewell royal Anglo-Saxon burial =

Archaeological site in Essex, England

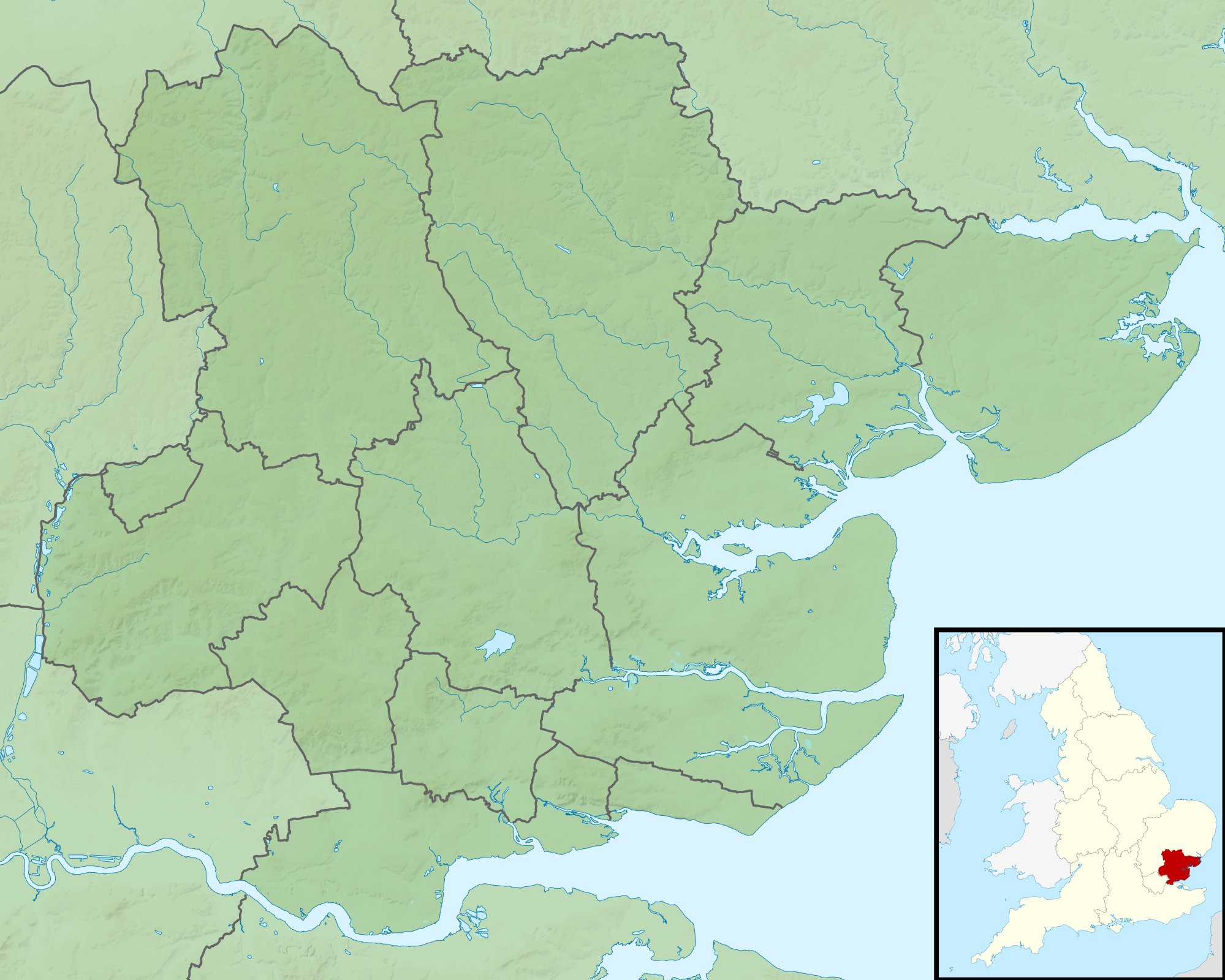
- Map of Essex showing the location of Prittlewell
- 51.55391°N 0.70873°E
- Type: Anglo-Saxon burial mound
- Periods: Anglo-Saxon England
- Cultures: Anglo-Saxons
- Associated with: ?Sæxa, brother of Sæberht of Essex
- Location: Prittlewell, Southend-on-Sea
- Region: Essex, England

History
- Built: c. 580

Site notes
- Excavation dates: 2003
- Archaeologists: MOLA
- Owner: Southend-on-Sea City Council
- Public access: Objects on permanent display at Southend Central Museum and Planetarium
- Website: www.southendmuseums.co.uk/princely-burial

The Prittlewell royal Anglo-Saxon burial or Prittlewell princely burial is a high-status Anglo-Saxon burial mound which was excavated at Prittlewell, north of Southend-on-Sea, in the English county of Essex.

Artefacts found by archaeologists in the burial chamber are of a quality that initially suggested that this tomb in Prittlewell was a tomb of one of the Anglo-Saxon Kings of Essex, and the discovery of golden foil crosses indicate that the burial was of an early Anglo-Saxon Christian. The burial is now dated to about 580, and is thought that it contained the remains of Sæxa, brother of Sæberht of Essex.

From 2019, some of the excavated artefacts are on permanent display in Southend Central Museum and Planetarium.

== Excavation ==
In the autumn of 2003, in preparation for a road-widening scheme, an archaeological survey was carried out on a plot of land to the north-east of Priory Park in Prittlewell. Earlier excavations had indicated Anglo-Saxon burials in the area, however it was not expected that such a significant find could be made. The archaeologists were lucky in the placement of their trench and uncovered a large Anglo-Saxon burial, and removed many important artefacts, mostly in metalwork. The site is located between the A1159 road and the Shenfield–Southend railway line, close to an Aldi supermarket and The Saxon King pub.

Archaeologists from the Museum of London Archaeology Service, under the supervision of Atkins Ltd, excavated the site and discovered an undisturbed 7th-century chamber grave beneath a mound. They described it as "the most spectacular discovery of its kind made during the past 60 years".

In total, about 110 objects were lifted by conservators in two phases, over a period of ten days. Some of the objects were block-lifted together with the soil in which they were embedded. The final lift was completed on 20 December 2003, with final defining of the chamber walls and back-filling continuing for three days after.

The quality and preservation of the Prittlewell chamber burial has led to comparisons with the Sutton Hoo Ship Burial and associated graves, discovered in 1939, as well as with the discovery of Tutankhamun's tomb in 1922.

== Burial chamber and artefacts ==
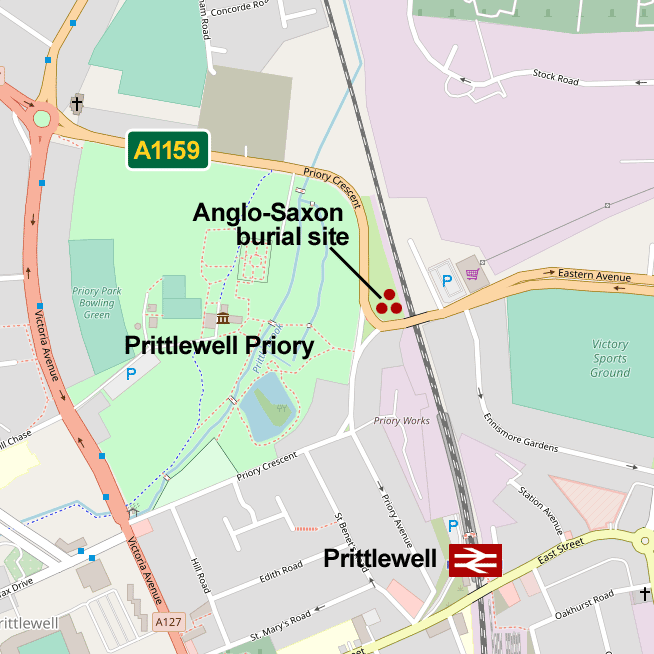
Location of the Anglo-Saxon burial in Prittlewell

Excavation demonstrated the burial chamber to be a deep, formerly timber-walled room full of objects of copper, gold, silver and iron, which had gradually collapsed and filled with soil as its wooden containing walls and ceiling decayed. The finds included an Anglo-Saxon hanging bowl, decorated with inlaid escutcheons and a cruciform arrangement of applied strips, a folding stool, three stave-built tubs or buckets with iron bands, a sword and a lyre, the last one of the most complete found in Britain. The tomb itself is 4 metres (13 ft) square, the largest chambered tomb ever discovered in England.

The body had been laid in a wooden coffin, with two small gold-foil crosses, one over each eye. One opinion was that he had been laid in the coffin by Christians, and that the coffin had been then buried by pagans, reflecting divided attitudes towards Christianity at the time. The early dating of the burial, before St Augustine's mission to England, has led to recent postulation that the crosses have limited religious significance, and were rather a sign of connection to the continent. They bear a resemblance to contemporary crosses found in Lombardy; they may have been buried with the 'prince' to imbue him with Romanitas, and suggest the growing strength of continental Latin Christian culture in southern England, but not represent personal conversion of faith. The acidic sandy soil had completely dissolved the body's bones, and any other bone in the tomb, but some pieces of human teeth were found, but too far affected by decay for DNA to be found in them.

The inventory of grave goods is comparable to one found in a burial in the Taplow Barrow in 1883, and though the overall collection is less sumptuous than that from the ship-burial in Mound 1 at Sutton Hoo, many individual objects are closely comparable and of similar quality. For example, there is a hollow gold belt buckle, but much plainer than that from Sutton Hoo, but the lyre, drinking vessels, and copper-alloy shoe buckles are very similar. As at Sutton Hoo, the best hope for closely dating the burial is the Merovingian gold coins, however the dating of these is a complicated matter, based on their metallic content rather than the design and information stamped on them. Research continues on this as on other aspects of the find, but the evidence initially suggests a date in the period 600–650, or 600–630. There is an object identified as a "standard", as at Sutton Hoo, but of a different type, and there is a folding stool of a type often seen in royal portraits in Early Medieval manuscripts (like a "curule seat") that is a unique find in England, and was probably imported.

The design of the lyre was reconstructed from soil impressions and surviving metal pieces. There was evidence that it had been repaired at least once. A copy of it was made in yew wood and played to accompany a funeral song sung for King Sæberht in Old English and English in St Mary's Church in Southend.

Some of the objects placed in the chamber were made in the eastern Mediterranean. These include a silver Byzantine spoon, a copper alloy flagon of a kind made in Asia Minor and the Levant, and a copper alloy basin of debated origin, traditionally known as a ‘Coptic Bowl’. All these items are rare, not commonly exported and quite new; they likely travelled to England not long after being produced.

== Theories about occupant ==
Based upon the array of rare objects in the burial from the eastern Mediterranean, scholars have posited several theories as to how they arrived there. Whilst Merovingian trade or diplomatic gift are common explanations, the historical context of the burial and new condition of the items has led some scholars to believe that the occupant acquired these objects whilst fighting in the eastern Mediterranean. The occupant feasibly served in the Middle East for the Byzantine Emperor Justin II as part of the Foederati, an elite, predominantly cavalry unit. Several contemporary sources attest to a massive recruitment campaign that reached well into northern Europe in 575, mustering thousands of horsemen to bolster the emperors military forces. The items in the tomb show that the buried was part of an equestrian elite; the chamber contained a scythe that could be used to collect fodder and drinking horns decorated with horses. The copper-alloy flagon, placed in a prestigious part of the burial, is decorated with images of St Sergius, an equestrian soldier. Such flagons came from the Sergius Cult based in remote Syria, a site of pilgrimage for cavalrymen, and a location the occupant would have been in 30 miles of had he been part of Justinian's cavalry units. Due to the possible connections between Byzantium and Britain in this period, the historical context of cavalry recruitment and the volume of rarely exported, relatively new artefacts placed in the burial, this is another plausible theory for the presence of eastern Mediterranean objects in a tomb in Britain, approximately 3,000 km from their origin.

In terms of the identity of the occupant, the quality of the locally made objects as well as the presence of imported items such as the Coptic bowl and flagon, appear to point to a royal burial. The most obvious candidates were originally thought to be either Sæberht of Essex (died 616) or his grandson Sigeberht II of Essex (murdered 653), who are the two East Saxon Kings known to have converted to Christianity during this period. As the evidence pointed to an early seventh century date, Sæberht was considered more likely.

However, carbon-dating techniques have since indicated a revised date in the late 6th century. In May 2019, it was reported that a team of 40 specialists from the Museum of London Archaeology (MOLA) now believe the tomb could have belonged to Sæxa, Sæberht's brother. Carbon dating had indicated that the tomb was built between 575 and 605, at least 11 years before Sæberht's death. Further details of the latest research have been published on the MOLA website.

It is, however, also possible that the occupant is of some other wealthy and powerful individual whose identity has gone unrecorded. In the meantime, the occupant has acquired the popular nickname of the "King of Bling", in reference to the rich grave goods.

For many years the location of Sæberht's remains has been uncertain. Medieval legend claims that Sæberht and his wife Queen Ethelgoda founded a monastery in London in 604 that later became the site of Westminster Abbey, and that they had been buried in the church there. A recessed marble tomb in the south ambulatory of the abbey purportedly contains the bones of Sæberht, although modern scholars cast doubt on its veracity.

== Post-excavation events ==
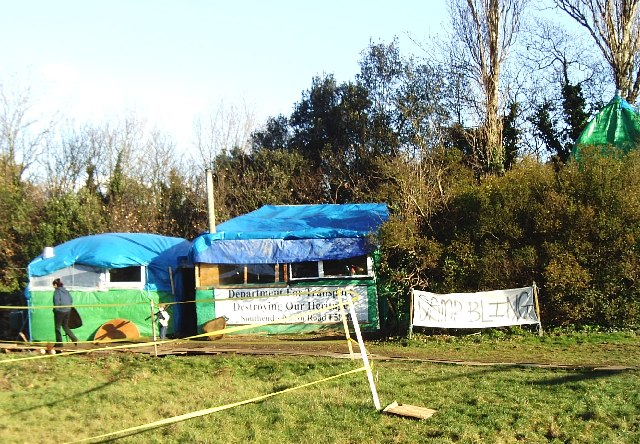
The "Camp Bling" protest camp in 2006

In 2004 a re-dedication of the King's tomb was hosted by the Bishop of Chelmsford John Gladwin and a large celebration event took place attended by over 5000 people in the area. The tomb was re-dedicated in a ceremony held at Prittlewell Priory supported by 85 local churches and voluntary organisations entitled 'Discover the King'. The event patron was local MP Sir Teddy Taylor and the chair of the organising event was Jonathan Ullmer.

After the discovery of the Prittlewell tomb and the completion of archaeological excavations, local protestors campaigned for Southend Borough Council to cancel the A1159 road road widening scheme, as the planned road would go across the burial site. From September 2005 to July 2009 the site was occupied by a road protest camp known locally as Camp Bling. In 2009 Southend Borough Council announced an alternative road improvement scheme at nearby Cuckoo Corner.

The Prittlewell tomb featured in a 2005 special episode of Channel 4's archaeological series Time Team, entitled "King of Bling", and devoted to Prittlewell.

The archaeological work was the winner of the Developer Funded Archaeology Award as part of the British Archaeological Awards for 2006. Southend Borough Council undertook to find a home for the archaeological finds in order to keep them in the borough, and announced that a new gallery would be created at Southend Central Museum to display the artefacts. After restoration work and carbon dating had been completed, the new museum gallery opened to the public in May 2019.

== Early Anglo-Saxon Prittlewell ==
In addition to the princely burial, there is other archaeological evidence of early Anglo-Saxon occupation of Prittlewell. A 1923 excavation in Priory Crescent revealed a 6th or 7th century Anglo-Saxon cemetery which may have extended into what is now Priory Park. The parish church, a short distance to the south, contains a remnant of a 7th-century church.

== The Prittlewell Princely Burial at Southend Central Museum ==
The star finds from the burial are on permanent display at Southend Central Museum one of four museums managed by Southend Museums, Southend-on-Sea City Council's museums service. The permanent gallery, opened to the public in 2019, was designed to replicate the dimensions, shape and feeling of a burial chamber.

The objects on display include the gold-foil crosses, the hanging bowl, glass beakers, gaming pieces, decorated drinking horns and the only known piece of Anglo-Saxon painted wood.
