= Prunella Stack =

British fitness pioneer and activist (1914–2010)

Ann Prunella Stack
- Born: 28 July 1914; Lansdowne, India
- Died: 30 December 2010 (aged 96)
- Known for: Head of the Women's League of Health and Beauty; OBE
- Spouse(s): Lord David Douglas-Hamilton (m. 1938; died 1944) Alistair "Ally" Albers (m. 1950; died 1951) Brian Power (m. 1964; died 2008)

Ann Prunella Stack OBE (28 July 1914 – 30 December 2010) was a British fitness pioneer and women's rights activist.

She was head of the Women's League of Health and Beauty which her mother Mary had founded in 1931. In 1953 she led a multiracial team to the coronation in London.

== Career ==
Her mother developed an exercise system that was brought to a mass market as the Women's League of Health & Beauty. Stack had participated in these exercises since a young child and became an instructor. She and her maternal aunt Norah Cruickshank headed the league from 1936 after the death of her mother. Stack undertook teaching, performing and public speaking while Cruickshank dealt with administration and public relations. She expanded the League in both the UK and British Empire as well as collaborating with the government's National Fitness Council (1937 - 1939) to promote physical fitness. One of the characteristics of the League was co-operation between participants in large-scale displays. In 1938 she visited Czechoslovakia to see Sokol gymnastics and also led League delegations to Hamburg in Germany and Helsinki Finland. The League contracted in scale during the Second World War and although Stack continued to teach and be involved with the organisation, others were prominent in the continuation of the League.

In 1945 she was elected as a Conservative councillor on Kensington Borough Council for Redcliff ward. She continued as a councillor for two years.

In 1950 she moved to South Africa with her second husband and opened multiracial exercise classes, bringing a multiracial team to the coronation of Queen Elizabeth II in 1953 against authority requirements. She returned to live in the UK in 1956 and continued working on women's fitness, remaining president through a name change to the Fitness League in 1999, and as more commercial fitness organisations came to the fore. The League staged a display in the Albert Hall in 2010 to celebrate its 80th anniversary.

She was a member of the Management Committee of the Outward Bound Trust at its inception in 1946, initially led the Advisory Committee on running Outward Bound courses for girls (that led to course for them being introduced in the early 1950s) and became vice-president of the Outward Bound Trust in 1980. She was appointed an Officer of the Order of the British Empire (OBE) in the 1980 Birthday Honours.

== Personal life ==
Stack was born in India, the daughter of a Sandhurst-trained 8th Gurkha Rifles officer, Captain Edward Hugh Bagot Stack (1885–1914), and his Irish wife, Mary Bagot Stack. Her father, born in Shillong in 1885, came from a line of Britons who had served in British India, her paternal grandfather having been the Indian Civil Service officer Edward Stack. At the onset of the First World War in 1914, her father was posted to France, while Stack and her mother embarked on a voyage to England; by the time of their arrival, news had arrived of her father's death in action at the Battle of La Bassée. He is buried in Nord-Pas-de-Calais, France.

She lived with her mother, maternal aunts and cousins in London during her childhood, visiting family in Ireland and the Isle of Skye for holidays. She was trained in her mother's exercise system from childhood and was included in lecture-demonstrations. In 1924 they moved from Maida Vale to a large house in Holland Park adjacent to the Ilchester estate where her mother started the Bagot Stack Health School. Stack attended Norland Place School, and then from the age of 13 attended her mother's school for training in dance and exercise, and also a private tutor for academic studies. From September 1930, aged 16, she attended the Abbey girls' boarding school in Malvern Wells for a year and gained perspective from a more conventional school life. This time initiated a love of the countryside as well as her decision to continue involvement with her mother's organisation, now called the Women's League of Health and Beauty. In 1936, during a visit to a social event in Oxford, she met a South African Rhodes Scholar medical student, Alfred ('Ally') Albers, who would eventually become her second husband. They met and took holidays together intermittently until her first marriage.

In 1937 she opened a swimming pool for a girls' school in Dorset and met Lord David Douglas-Hamilton among the other guests. She subsequently met him at other events, and spent time with him and his family, including visiting Dorset, Scotland and Austria. This included climbing in mountains. She also met Kurt Hahn in his company. In 1938 she made the decision to accept the hand in marriage of Douglas-Hamilton and the wedding took place in Glasgow Cathedral. They had two sons, Diarmaid Douglas-Hamilton and Iain Douglas-Hamilton. Douglas-Hamilton, then a squadron leader in the Royal Air Force, was killed in 1944 when his damaged airplane crashed following enemy action over France.

In 1950, Stack married the surgeon Ally Albers in South Africa. Albers died in a climbing accident in 1951, while climbing Table Mountain accompanied by his wife. In 1964, she married Brian Power. He had been born and spent his childhood in Tianjin, China to Irish/British parents who lived in the British Concession. In 1936 he went to study law at King's College, University of London, planning to return to China. However, when the Second World War broke out he joined the Royal Irish Fusiliers in the British Army in 1940 and then remained in the UK working as a barrister. He died in 2008.
