= Saba Douglas-Hamilton =

Kenyan wildlife conservationist and television presenter

- Born: 7 June 1970 (age 56); Nairobi, Kenya
- Education: University of St Andrews
- Occupations: Broadcaster, naturalist
- Spouse: Frank Pope
- Children: 3
- Father: Iain Douglas-Hamilton

Saba Iassa Douglas-Hamilton (born 7 June 1970) is a Kenyan wildlife conservationist and television presenter. She has worked for a variety of conservation charities, and has appeared in wildlife documentaries produced by the BBC and other broadcasters. She is currently the manager of Elephant Watch Camp in Kenya's Samburu National Reserve and Special Projects Director for the charity Save the Elephants.

== Early life ==
Saba was born in Nairobi Hospital, Nairobi, to zoologist Iain and Oria Douglas-Hamilton (née Rocco). Saba means "seven" in the Swahili language; she was named by Maasai women because she was born on 7 June at 7pm and was the seventh grandchild. Her first language was Swahili and she grew up playing with the local Kenyan children. Her father went to Africa as a young man to study and conserve elephant populations. Her white African ancestry comes from her mother who is the daughter of Italians who settled in Kenya in the 1920s. Her mother still farms at Lake Naivasha in the Great Rift Valley.

She is a great-granddaughter of Alfred Douglas-Hamilton, the 13th Duke of Hamilton.

== Education ==
Saba did not start school in Kenya until she was seven, then went to Britain to an all-girls boarding school for three years which she later described as "like a prison". She went on to attend the United World College of the Atlantic in South Wales to study for the International Baccalaureate. She gained a place at St Andrews University in Scotland and was awarded a master's degree in Social Anthropology with a thesis on "Concepts of Love and Sexuality amongst the Bajuni People of Kiwaiyu Island, Kenya".

== Snake bite ==
When she was 18, Douglas-Hamilton was on a camel safari when she was bitten on her leg by a venomous snake. Though sometimes misreported as an asp, this was identified as a carpet viper. Friends made a pressure bandage and gave her electric shocks to denature the venom until help came the following morning with the Flying Doctors.

== Charity work ==
When she returned to Africa from her studies in the UK she worked for the Save the Rhino Trust in Namibia, mentored by conservationist Blythe Loutit. Douglas-Hamilton has served as a trustee of Save the Elephants, a charity founded by her father. Based in Samburu National Reserve in the Great Rift Valley, Kenya, Save the Elephants carries out detailed long-term monitoring of the local elephant population, and deploys sophisticated elephant tracking techniques there and across the continent. Through the charity she has worked to support, protect and increase awareness of issues which threaten to erode African elephant populations and their habitats.

In 2008, Douglas-Hamilton supported Merlin (Medical Emergency Relief International), the UK medical aid agency, to raise money for emergency health services following post-election violence when some 500 people were killed and more than 300,000 Kenyans were left without homes or clean water.

She is also host of the annual Future For Nature Awards in Burgers Zoo, and chair of Future For Nature's International Selection Committee.

== Television career ==
Since 2000, Douglas-Hamilton has appeared in wildlife documentaries produced by the BBC and others. Many of these have been set in Africa and have featured elephants – an animal with which she became very familiar during her childhood. From 2002, she co-presented the Big Cat Diary series with Jonathan Scott and Simon King. She has also appeared in wildlife programmes set in other countries and regions, such as India, Lapland and in the Arctic, where she filmed polar bears. From 2004, Douglas-Hamilton presented short pieces on holiday destinations in the BBC Holiday series. In 2006, she appeared alongside Nigel Marven in an episode of Prehistoric Park in which she travelled back 10,000 years to study sabre-toothed cats. She produced and narrated a documentary, Heart of a Lioness, about a wild lioness called Kamunyak, "the blessed one," which acted as a maternal guardian for the lion's natural prey: an antelope. In 2007, she presented the TV programme Saba and the Rhino's Secret on black rhino in Namibia.

In 2008, she produced and presented Rhino Nights for Animal Planet, again using night-time cinematography to capture black rhino behaviour. The same year she presented a three-part BBC documentary, Unknown Africa, on the state of wildlife in Comoros, Central African Republic and Angola. In 2009, Douglas-Hamilton presented a three-part BBC documentary series, The Secret Life of Elephants, with her father Iain. It explored the lives of elephants in Kenya's Samburu reserve and the work of the Save the Elephants research team.

In 2014, the BBC Natural History Unit filmed a 10-part series, This Wild Life, (with 2 extra episodes for international markets) on Douglas-Hamilton’s work and family life at Elephant Watch Camp in Samburu. The series was first broadcast in the UK in September 2015.

== Personal life ==
In February 2006, Douglas-Hamilton married conservationist and journalist Frank Pope in a traditional Kenyan ceremony. They live in a rustic house outside Nairobi that borders the famous Rothschild's Giraffe Sanctuary. They have three daughters: Selkie (born in March 2009) and younger twins Mayian and Luna.
