= Ben Nealon =

British actor

- Born: Benjamin John Aldington Nealon; 29 December 1966 (age 59); Exeter, Devon, England
- Occupation: Actor
- Years active: 1993–present

Benjamin John Aldington Nealon OBE (born 29 December 1966 in Exeter, Devon) is a British actor best known for playing 2nd Lt/Lt/Capt Jeremy Forsythe in the ITV award-winning series Soldier Soldier. Nealon was attracted to a career in acting at the age of 7 when he saw Peter O'Toole's performance in Lawrence of Arabia but his part in Soldier Soldier was his second television role, having appeared in an episode of Between the Lines the previous year.

He has since been in TV series such as Bugs, Casualty, The Bill, I Shouldn't Be Alive, Doctors and EastEnders.

Nealon was also in the Indian films Lagaan and Mangal Pandey: The Rising. In both films he portrayed Hindi-speaking British Army officers who oppressed the local population during the time of British India.

Nealon has been involved in Pump Aid since he met Ian Thorpe, Amos Chitungo and Tendai Mawunga whilst filming in Zimbabwe in 1998. He convened the first trustees meeting in January 1999 and is currently the development director. He was appointed Officer of the Order of the British Empire (OBE) in the 2012 Birthday Honours for services to Pump Aid.

In 2015 he has been touring in Bill Kenwright's production of Agatha Christie's And Then There Were None, playing Philip Lombard.
