= Maurice Pope (linguist) =

British linguist (1926–2019)

- Born: 17 February 1926; London, England
- Died: 1 August 2019 (aged 93)
- Education: Sherborne School, University of Cambridge
- Spouse: Johanna Pope
- Children: 6, including Frank

Maurice Wildon Montague Pope (17 February 1926 – 1 August 2019) was a British linguist, specialist in Classics, one of leading researchers of the Cretan script Linear A.

Born in London, he graduated from Cambridge University. In 1949, became a lecturer in Classics at the University of Cape Town, lecturer from 1952, professor from 1957.

In 1957, he replaced professor George P. Gould as the Head of Classics. In co-authorship with Gould he published several articles on the Minoan Linear A script.

Along with linguistics Pope was interested in archaeology. He often participated in archaeological expeditions, and in 1954 participated in an underwater expedition of the Archaeological School of Athens near Chios.

In 1960s, he was Dean of the Faculty of Arts at the University of Cape Town.

The hero of J. M. Coetzee's 2002 book "Youth" (pp 23–24) describes the Cape Town Classics Department: "Greek and pure mathematics are in his eyes the noblest subjects one can study at a university. From afar he reveres the lecturers in Greek, whose courses he cannot take: Anton Paap, papyrologist; Maurice Pope, translator of Sophocles; Maurits Heemstra, commentator on Heraclitus. Together with Douglas Sears, Professor of Pure Mathematics, they inhabit an exalted realm."

In August 1968, Pope resigned from his position and left the university, as he strongly disagreed with the interference of the racist government in the university's policy (namely, the government forced the university authorities to dismiss a job offer previously issued to a Black person). In 1969, Maurice Pope moved to teach and research in Oxford University.

In the 1980s, in cooperation with Jacques Raison, he prepared and published a corpus of Minoan Linear A inscriptions.

== Military service ==
Maurice served as an officer in the Royal Navy from (July 1944 - November 1946). He served on the LCT 1187 that was part of the flotilla of H.M.S. Troubadour. In his autobiography "Amateur" he recounts his experiences of the war.

== Selected works ==
- Corpus transnuméré du Linéaire A (avec J. Raison).
- The Story of Decipherment: From Egyptian Hieroglyphs to Maya Script: From Egyptian Hieroglyphics to Maya Script 1999, New York: Thames & Hudson. ISBN 978-0500281055
- The Ancient Greeks: How They Lived and Worked 1976, Newton Abbot: David & Charles. ISBN 0715370812
- Upon the Country – Juries and the Principle of Random Selection. Social Science Information 28, no. 2 (June 1989): 265-289
- The Keys to Democracy - Sortition As a New Model For Citizen Power. 2023, Imprint Academic. ISBN 9781788360975
