= Mary Bagot Stack =

Irish health and fitness expert

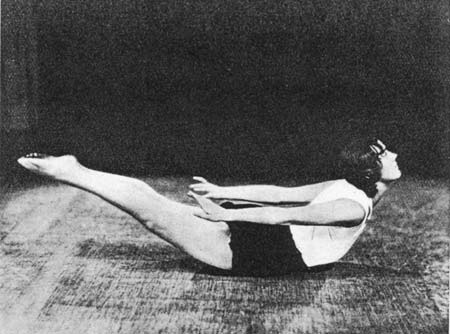
- "Seal" posture, now called Salabhasana or Locust Pose
- Born: 12 June 1883; Dublin
- Died: 26 January 1935 (aged 51); London
- Education: Alexandra College, Dublin
- Known for: Mass market keep-fit system in 1930s Britain
- Notable work: Building the Body Beautiful, the Bagot Stack Stretch-and-Swing System, 1931
- Spouse(s): Albert Thomas James McCreery (divorced); Edward Hugh Bagot Stack (d. 1914)
- Children: Prunella Stack (28 July 1914 – 30 December 2010)

Mary Bagot Stack (12 June 1883 – 26 January 1935), known as Mollie Bagot Stack, founded the Women's League of Health & Beauty in 1930, the first and most significant mass keep-fit system of the 1930s in the UK. This has continued as an exercise system into the 21st century.

== Education ==
After an education at Alexandra School and Alexandra College, Dublin, she enrolled in 1907 as a trainee teacher at Mrs Josef Conn's Institute of Physical Training in London. She had met Mrs Conn in Paris and was inspired by her specialisation in exercises to promote health. By 1910, she had moved to Manchester and set up her fitness centre with private classes, large classes for women factory workers and also treated private patients.

== Development of the Bagot Stack Exercise System ==
In the 1920s, she again began to hold classes, initially for children in her own home, and by 1926 was training teachers in her system at the Bagot Stack Health School in Holland Park, London. This initially involved 12 sequences of exercise designed to train the body by the seven principles of the Bagot Stack System. There were classes for women and children in dance as well as exercises. Her inspiration for developing her exercise system came from a short time in India, where she observed the differences in movement between women wearing constricting European clothes and those with looser Indian clothing. She had also studied hatha yoga on her travels in India. She developed a series of exercises based on her belief that movement was essential in life. This also fitted with ideas developing across Europe at the time of the benefits to women of exercise and changes in clothing fashions. As well as involving vigorous group exercises, the classes were designed to be sociable, which benefited the many recently bereaved women.

== Mass market ==
Her big innovation was to move from small, private classes to a mass-market movement. In 1930 this grew into a commercial enterprise, the Women's League of Health and Beauty, using the YMCA's Regent Street premises. Public displays in London garnered publicity, and more centres started in 1932 in Bromley, Southend, Slough, Bournemouth, Croydon, Birmingham, Glasgow followed by Ayr, Paisley and Edinburgh and finally franchised centres all over the UK. The Women's League of Health and Beauty classes included elements from dance, callisthenics, and remedial, slimming, and rhythmical exercise to music. The League published its own magazine, Mother and Daughter, from 1933 to 1935 with content on pacifism and feminist political discussion as well as general self-improvement. Her book Building the Body Beautiful - The Bagot Stack stretch-and-swing system was published in 1931.

The organisation has been described as the most popular female physical culture organization in Britain. The league adapted eugenicist terms and saw women as "natural race builders". They aimed to promote "racial health" through physical exercise. The organisation grew rapidly so that by 1934 there were 47,000 members but this had grown to 166,000 in 1937. Her daughter Prunella, along with others, continued promoting this exercise system so that what is now called the Flexercise movement continues as a national fitness programme in the UK.

== Personal life ==
Stack was born on 12 June 1883 in Dublin, to parents from the Irish Protestant professional class. Her father was a dentist, Richard Theodore Stack (d. 1909). She contracted rheumatic fever at the age of 17. She married in 1909 (Albert Thomas James McCreery, a doctor) but this was short-lived ending in divorce. She married again on 10 March 1912 to a third cousin, Edward Hugh Bagot Stack (1884 - 1914), a captain in the Gurkha Rifles, who was killed in the First World War. She travelled with him to India, living in Lansdowne, a hill station near the Himalayas, but returned to the UK at the outbreak of war with her newborn daughter. She died in London on 26 January 1935, aged 51 after suffering from thyroid cancer.

Her first child died at birth in 1913. The second, Ann Prunella, was born in India on 28 July 1914.

== See also ==
- Marguerite Agniel
- Genevieve Stebbins
- Yoga in Britain

== Sources ==
- Singleton, Mark (2010). Yoga body : the origins of modern posture practice. Oxford University Press. ISBN 978-0-19-539534-1. OCLC 318191988.
