= Pump Aid =

International non-profit organisation

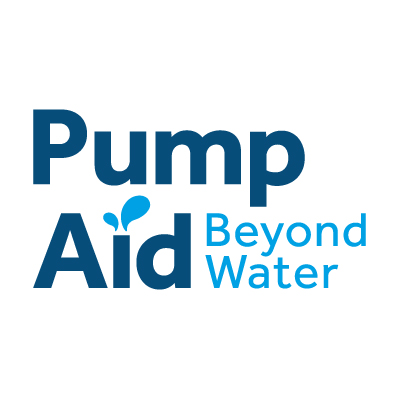
- Formation: 1998
- Type: Non-governmental organisation
- Legal status: Registered charity
- Purpose: Water and sanitation
- Headquarters: Development House, 56-64 Leonard Street, London EC2A 4LT
- Location: London, United Kingdom
- Region served: Africa
- Chief Executive: Michael Chuter
- Main organ: Board of Trustees
- Staff: 60
- Website: pumpaid.org

Pump Aid is an international non-profit organisation that was set up in 1998. It is headquartered in London and delivers all its services in Africa, mostly in Malawi. Pump Aid is a WASH (Water, Sanitation and Hygiene) NGO and is part of a worldwide programme committed to the delivery of the UN’s Sustainable Development Goals and the total eradication of water poverty by 2030.

Pump Aid had offices in Malawi and London, and as of 2018 employed approximately 23 people, 70% of whom were based in Africa. Most of whom are national staff in Malawi trained in well-digging and water-pump installation.

== History ==
Pump Aid was founded in 1998 by three teachers working in a rural primary school in Zimbabwe. Two of their pupils fell ill from contaminated water and died. These teachers realised the need for health superseded the need for education and so set up Pump Aid to provide wells in rural communities. The Zimbabwe government estimates that 10% of that country's rural population now accesses water through pumps supplied by Pump Aid.

In 2006, Pump Aid began working in Malawi where the bulk of its projects are now based. Malawi is the sixth poorest country in the world (by GDP per capita) and is ranked 170 (out of 188) on the UN Human Development Index. 85% of Malawi's population is engaged in and relies on rain-fed small-scale farming and only 11% of small-scale farmers have access to any form of irrigation.

Celebrity supporters of the charity have included Corinne Bailey Rae, Kym Marsh, and Ben Nealon.

== Elephant Pump ==
Pump Aid's improved access to rural WASH programme is based around its take on a traditional rope and washer pump, known as the Elephant Pump.

The Elephant Pump, based on a c. 2,000 year-old Chinese design, is a rope pump consisting of a "rope, a plastic pipe, some rubber washers and a winding wheel". It was designed both to be low cost, with a c. $500 price, and to be easily serviced and maintained by the local community. A 2015 study of 338 pumps in Malawi indicated a significant proportion conformed to water quality standards, and that local community members indicated that repairs are mostly considered "easy". The name "Elephant Pump" refers to the pump's strength, shape, and reliability.

As of 2009 the Elephant Pump has provided clean water to c. 1.2 million people living in rural areas of Zimbabwe and Malawi.

== Awards and recognition ==
- Winner of the 2005 and 2008 St Andrews Prize for the Environment
- Winner, International aid and development, UK Charity Awards 2017
