= Norland Place School =

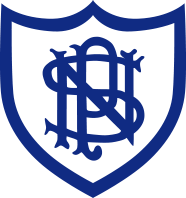

Location
- Holland Park Avenue; London, W11 4UH; England
- Coordinates: 51°30′21″N 0°12′42″W

Information
- Type: Private, Preparatory
- Motto: Follow the Light, Uphold the Right
- Founded: 1876
- Founder: Emily Lord
- Department for Education URN: 100510 Tables
- Headmaster: Patrick Mattar
- Gender: Co-educational
- Age: 4 to 11
- Enrolment: c. 220
- Website: http://www.norlandplace.com/

Norland Place School is a co-educational independent preparatory school for boys and girls 4–11 in Holland Park, London. The school was founded in 1876 by Emily Lord.

== History ==
Founded in 1876 by Emily Lord, Norland Place School originally housed at 9 Norland Place, now known as No.166 Holland Park Avenue. In the late nineteenth century, the school moved into Nos.164, 166 and 168 Holland Park Avenue. In 1915, Elizabeth MacClymont became headmistress, a position she held for thirty-four years. In the 1920s, Swedish carpentry (slöjd) was amongst the subjects taught to some 332 pupils at the school and Norland obtained its own sports ground in Ealing, where hockey, cricket and tennis were taught. Upon MacClymont's retirement in 1949, the school's wrought iron gates were put up.

== The present school ==
From September 2020, the school will embark on a three-year plan to accommodate boys in Years 4 to 6. Most boys progress to schools such as Sussex House, Colet Court, Westminster Under and Wetherby. Most girls progress to schools such as Francis Holland, Downe House and St Paul's Girls' School.

Norland has been described by The Good Schools Guide as a "very traditional school (from the berets and boaters to the emphasis on good manners and fair play) but combined with a forward-looking approach." According to Tatler, Norland is one of London's top prep schools.

== Famous pupils ==
Notable former pupils include:

- Hilary Benn, politician
- Rosalind Franklin, chemist
- Finola Hughes, actress
- Sylvestra Le Touzel, actress
- George Osborne, former Chancellor of the Exchequer
- Roger Westman, architect
- Joan Beauchamp Procter, zoologist
- Prunella Stack, woman's rights advocate
- Veronica Wedgwood, historian
