= Anglo-Saxon burial mounds =

Burial mounds produced during the 6th and 7th centuries CE

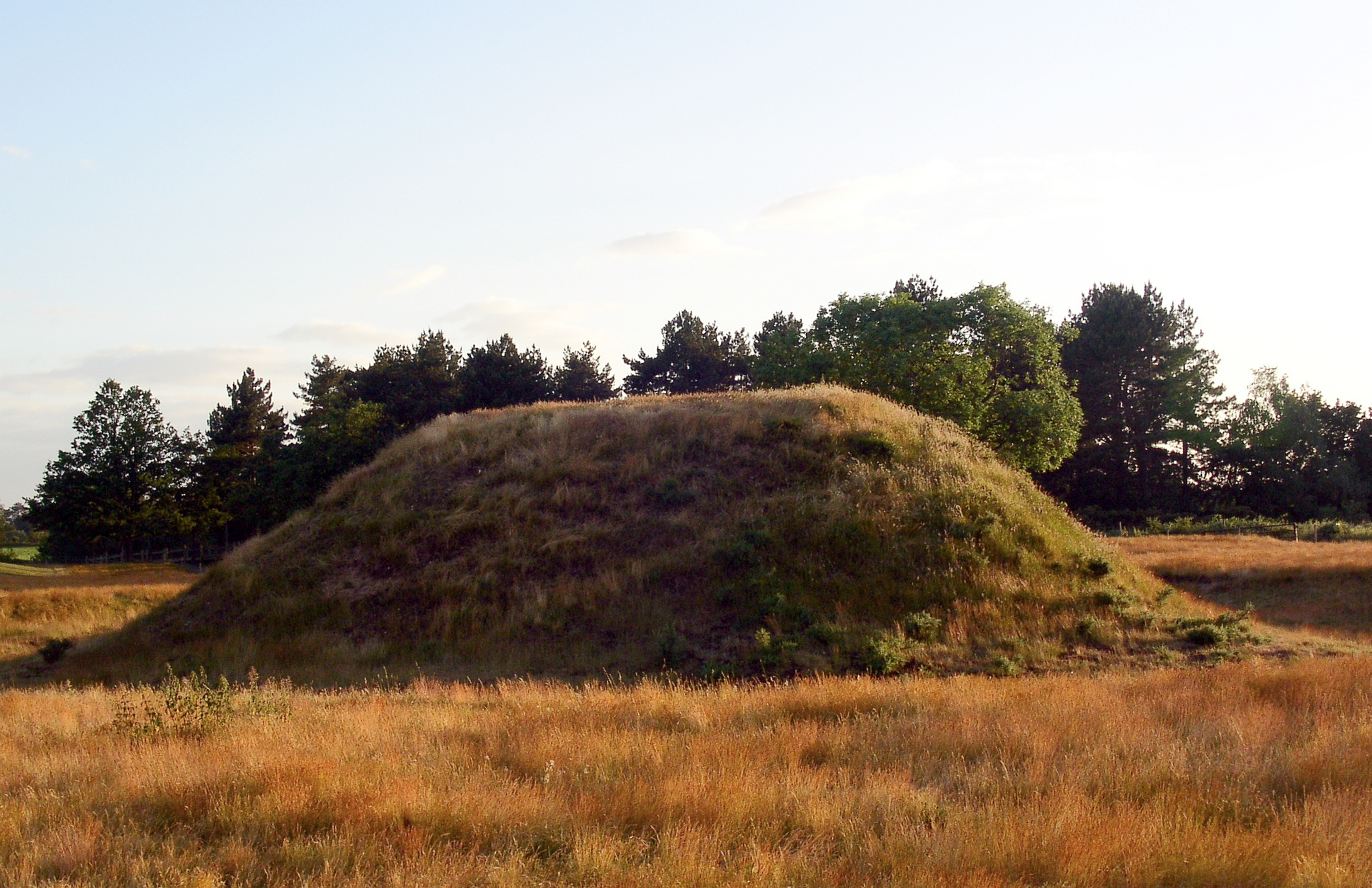
Mound 2 is the only Sutton Hoo tumulus to have been reconstructed to its supposed original height.

An Anglo-Saxon burial mound is an accumulation of earth and stones erected over a grave or crypt during the late sixth and seventh centuries AD in Anglo-Saxon England. These burial mounds are also known as barrows or tumuli.

Early Anglo-Saxon burial involved both inhumation and cremation, with burials then being deposited in cemeteries. At this time, the Anglo-Saxons adhered to a pagan religion, but as Christianity was introduced in the seventh century, it gradually became the dominant and eventually sole religion amongst the Anglo-Saxon kingdoms. Many of those buried in barrows were pagan, but others were instead Christian, and it is usually impossible for archaeologists to know which religion an individual belonged to.

Earlier peoples living in Britain during the Neolithic and Bronze Ages had also constructed barrows for use as places of burial, something that was recognised by the Anglo-Saxon burial builders, who in many cases re-used these earlier barrows for their own uses.

== Background ==
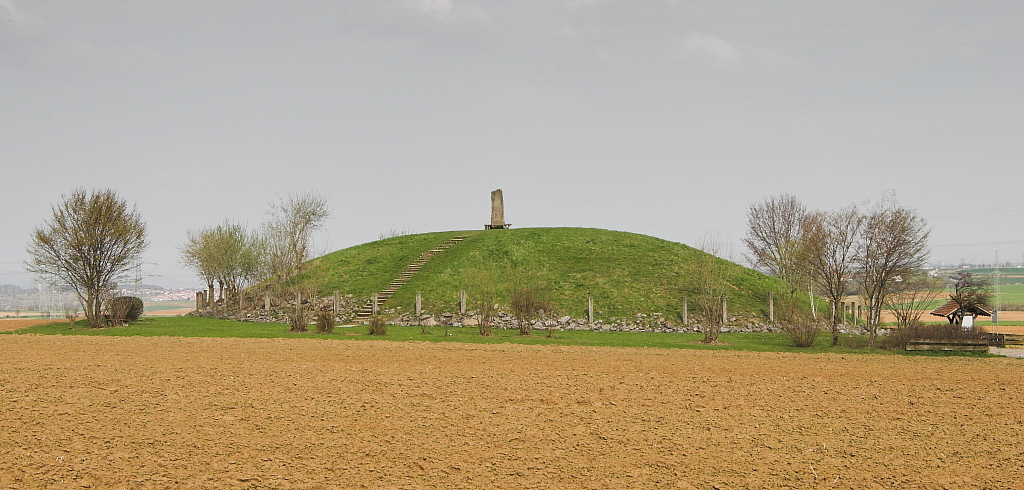
A reconstruction of the Hochdorf Chieftain's Grave, a large Iron Age burial mound dating from c. 550 BCE in Baden-Württemberg, Germany. Although constructed a thousand years before the Anglo-Saxon barrows, there are cultural similarities between the two.

Tumulus burials were not restricted to the Anglo-Saxons, but had a long pedigree in prehistoric and early mediaeval Europe. By this latter date, when the Anglo-Saxon society existed, such burials were not restricted to any one cultural or ethnic group, with Germanic-speaking, Slavic-speaking and Celtic-speaking peoples of the period all taking part in such a burial practice for elite members of their societies.

In the Roman Iron Age, whilst the construction of barrows had ended in Britain, it had continued in areas of continental Europe free from Roman domination. The Hallstatt culture which existed in central Europe between c. 750 and 400 BCE utilised chamber burials within barrows as the way of commemorating deceased members of the social elite. The most prominent known Hallstatt example is the Hochdorf Chieftain's Grave, which dates from c. 550 BCE and which was richly laden with grave goods.

By the sixth century CE, when the practice of building burial mounds is first adopted by the Anglo-Saxons, it was also being practiced by other Germanic-speaking peoples on continental Europe. In the German region of Thuringia, several important chamber burial barrows have been excavated, including at a cemetery in Trossingen which dates to c. 580 CE, thereby being contemporary with similar Anglo-Saxon sites.

== Introduction of burial mounds ==
The Anglo-Saxon peoples had migrated to Britain during the fifth century CE, settling primarily along the eastern areas of what is now England. They were adherents of a pagan religion. The practice of Anglo-Saxon barrow burials had been adopted by the Merovingian dynasty Franks, who lived in what is now France, from the mid fifth century CE. It was from these Merovingian Franks that the Anglo-Saxons likely adopted the practice.

Throughout the sixth century, the south-eastern Anglo-Saxon Kingdom of Kent developed political ties with the Merovingian kings in Francia, with their respective royal families eventually being sealed through a marriage alliance. It was through this connection that the Kentish Anglo-Saxons adopted the Merovingian practice of burying members of their social elite in large tumuli. The importance and influence of the Kentish kingdom across the south of England subsequently led to Anglo-Saxon peoples north of the river Thames also adopting the practice. This seems to be a contradiction, and whether or not such mounds were indigenous to either respective area is debatable and likely developed through earlier migrations, later experiencing a pseudo-renaissance.

== Construction ==
The construction and burial within a burial mound would have been a lengthier process than ordinary Anglo-Saxon inhumation or cremation burials, with funerary rites and preparations having lasted for at least a week.

The first step in a barrow burial would have been the removal of a circular area of topsoil, which was then encircled with a ditch where the soil had been dug even deeper. Archaeologist Martin Carver believed that this first stage had a symbolic significance in setting aside an inner and an outer zone between where the burial was going to be built and the outside world around it.

The second step in the process involved a grave cut then being made into the ground with enough space for an inhumation burial. Some of the most prestigious barrows contained burial chambers with richly-furnished wooden rooms buried within the mound. In others, the corpse had simply been interred and had had a mass of stones and earth raised on surface.

In the case of some inhumation burials, a step or platform was cut into one of the ends of the grave so that mourners at the funeral could kneel down and arrange the corpse and their grave goods. In certain cases, the grave-cut, or at least its bottom, was sealed with clay prior to the body then being placed into it with their grave goods.

With the body then in the grave, a funerary service would have taken place, involving the performance of certain rituals and the eating of a graveside meal. A covering would then have been placed over the body, which was usually textile but in some cases was instead made up of hazel poles or stakes. In the case of chamber burials, it is at this point that the chamber that the body was in would have been sealed up with a wooden roof. At this point the grave would have been complete, and the next step would have been to build the earthen mound on top. Some of this would have come from the ring ditch surrounding the barrow, although other soil would have come from the surrounding area. It is possible that when the mound was finally constructed, a timber post would have been inserted into the top, marking the burial.

== Purpose ==
Various archaeologists and historians have discussed why the barrows were built by the Anglo-Saxons and for what purpose. Anglo-Saxon specialist Stephen Pollington noted that they were ways of creating "a permanent mark on the landscape" which allowed them to claim "the territory and the right to hold it".

Pollington also remarked that "the burial chamber was an idealised portrayal of the 'house of the dead', the last resting place of the deceased into which they would welcome those who sought them out through spirit travel." Weston Wyly interpreted them as being symbolic of the pregnant belly of the earth, into which the corpse, representing the human seed, was planted.

== See also ==
- Death in Norse paganism
- Norse funeral
- Prittlewell royal Anglo-Saxon burial
