= Norland University of Early Childhood =

British higher education provider specialising in childcare

Coordinates: 51.3759877°N 2.3731692°W

Norland University of Early Childhood is a British university based in Bath, Somerset. The college specialises in childcare, and trains nannies, nursery nurses and other childcare professionals, who are employed worldwide.

Norland nannies are seen as a status symbol and are popular among celebrities and royals. Norland offers a three year degree programme: the BA (Hons) in Early Years Development and Learning, followed by a one year Norland diploma programme. In March 2019, Norland was awarded Taught Degree Awarding Powers by the Privy Council, which allows it to offer the degree through their institution, as well as enabling it to mark all student assessments internally.

Norland College acquired university status on the 7th September 2026 formally becoming Norland University of Early Childhood and the city of Bath's third university.

== History ==
Norland was founded in Norland Place, Kensington in 1892 by Emily Ward. It is the world's oldest childcare training institution. Ward believed in affectionate care which focused on the needs of the child and wanted to train nannies that would devote themselves to their charges and avoid using corporal punishment as much as possible.

Norland has been based at various locations throughout the United Kingdom, notably Chislehurst in Kent and Denford Park near Hungerford in Berkshire, and is currently based in Bath. Originally, Norland contained daycare and boarding facilities for infants alongside the training college for nannies. Norland in its current iteration in Bath is solely an educational institute.

In February 1999, the first male nanny trainee was accepted, and in 2012 the first male undergraduate was admitted.

== Curriculum ==
From cooking and nutrition, to sewing and hairdressing, to theatre courses and self-defence, to lectures on sleep, neuroscience and child psychology […] the students learn how to play in the great outdoors, and how to drive in adverse conditions in order to keep their charges safe from the paparazzi and other potential dangers.

— The Guardian

Students obtain a three-year BA in Early Years Development and Learning or BA Early Childhood Education and Care, followed by a fourth year working in a family on a similar trainee basis. This year is called the Newly Qualified Nanny (NQN) year and only graduates of this are awarded their Norland Diploma. Students at Norland rotate terms between lectures in a classroom and placements in families, schools and nurseries, as well as at the Royal United Hospital on the maternity ward. They are also trained in tactical driving and self-defence in case they are hired by high-profile clients whose children might need such protection.
