= Emily Ward =

British educator (1850–1930)

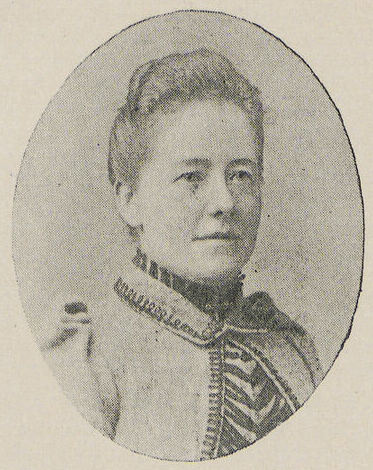
Emily Ward in 1899

Emily Mary Jane Ward, née Lord (13 August 1850 – 15 June 1930), was a pioneer of childcare education in England. She founded several institutions including Norland Place School and, most notably, the Norland Institute.

== Biography ==
Lord was born on 13 August 1850, in Derby, England.

In her early twenties she joined Notting Hill High School as an infant teacher.

Heavily influenced by the ideas of Friedrich Fröbel, she founded Norland Place School in 1876 when it separated from the School as ‘Miss Lord’s Kindergarten’. She attended the preliminary meeting of the Froebel Society in 1874. There, she served on its council with Mary Lyschinska, Ada Berry, the Rev. Alfred Bourne and the educational campaigners Emily Shirreff and Maria Grey. In 1881, she lived at 9-10 Norland Square as "proprietor and teacher of Kinder Garten." She was sister of Henrietta Frances Lord, who was a feminist, a Poor Law guardian, and a friend of Olive Schreiner.

In 1892, she opened the Norland Institute, a training school for nanny girls and children's nurses, and in the following years steered it to a position of international respect. She died on 15 June 1930, in Bognor.

== Private life ==
In 1891, at the age of 40, she married Walter Cyril Ward.
