= Iain Douglas-Hamilton =

British zoologist (1942–2025)

Iain Douglas-Hamilton CBE
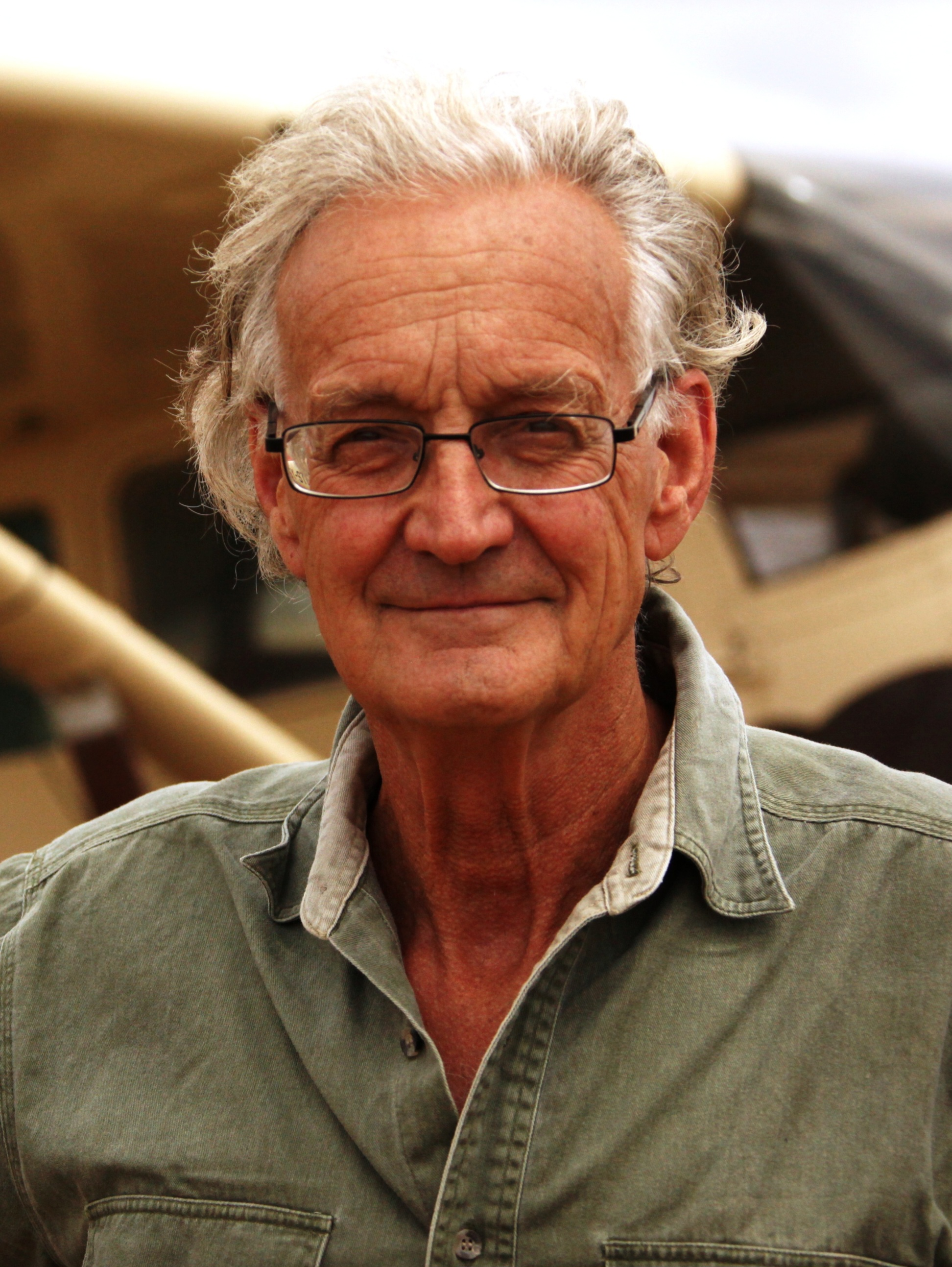
- Douglas-Hamilton in 2010
- Born: 16 August 1942; Ferne, Shaftesbury, England
- Died: 8 December 2025 (aged 83); Nairobi, Kenya
- Education: Oriel College, Oxford (BSc, DPhil)
- Occupation: Zoologist
- Known for: Study of elephant behaviour
- Spouse: Oria Rocco
- Children: 2; including Saba
- Awards: Commander of the Order of the British Empire; Indianapolis Prize; Order of the Golden Ark
- Scientific career
- Thesis: The Ecology and Behaviour of the African Elephant – The Elephants of Lake Manyara
- Doctoral advisor: Nikolaas Tinbergen

Iain Douglas-Hamilton CBE (16 August 1942 – 8 December 2025) was a Scottish zoologist from Oxford University and one of the world's foremost authorities on the African elephant. In 1993, he founded Save the Elephants, which is dedicated to securing a future for elephants and their habitats.

Douglas-Hamilton pioneered the first in-depth scientific study of elephant social behaviour in Tanzania's Lake Manyara National Park, aged 23. His work in the 1960s paved the way for much of today's understanding of elephants and current conservation practices. During the 1970s, he investigated the status of elephants throughout Africa and was the first to alert the world to the ivory poaching holocaust, bringing about the first global ivory trade ban in 1989.

For his work on elephants, he was awarded two of conservation's highest awards – the Order of the Golden Ark in 1988, the Order of the British Empire in 1992, and the Commander of the British Empire (CBE) in 2015. In 2010, he was named the recipient of the Indianapolis Prize, the world's leading award for animal conservation. In May 2012, Douglas-Hamilton spoke at the Senate Foreign Relations Committee hearing on Ivory and Insecurity: The Global Implications of Poaching in Africa.

== Background ==
Douglas-Hamilton was born on 16 August 1942 at Ferne House, near Shaftesbury, Dorset, the younger son of Lord David Douglas-Hamilton and Ann Prunella Stack, a women's fitness pioneer. He is the grandson of Alfred Douglas-Hamilton, 13th Duke of Hamilton and Nina Douglas-Hamilton, Duchess of Hamilton, an animal rights activist. His godparents at his christening were his uncle Nigel, Earl of Selkirk and aunt Lady Margaret Hay-Drummond. His older brother, Diarmaid, was a physicist. Their father, a Royal Air Force officer and Spitfire pilot, was killed in the war in 1944.

He attended Gordonstoun School in Scotland between 1955 and 1960. From the time he was 10 years old, Iain dreamed that he would fly around Africa and save animals. He went on to study zoology at Oxford University, earning first a bachelor's degree, in 1965, and then a D.Phil., in 1972.

Douglas-Hamilton was married to Oria Douglas-Hamilton, founder of Elephant Watch Camp, in Samburu National Reserve, Kenya, with whom he had two daughters: Saba, a television presenter, and Dudu, a conservationist. The Douglas-Hamiltons lived in Kenya. Douglas-Hamilton and his wife, Oria, have co-authored two award-winning books, Among the Elephants (1975) and Battle for the Elephants (1992), and have made several television films. He died at his home in Nairobi, Kenya on 8 December 2025, at the age of 83.

== Africa ==
=== Manyara, Tanzania ===
At the age of 23, Douglas-Hamilton moved to Tanzania to live in the wild in Lake Manyara National Park, where he carried out the first scientific study of the social interactions of the African elephant. From that study came his hypothesis, rooted in behavioural ecology, that elephant movements could hold the key to understanding their reactions to their changing environments. Douglas-Hamilton argues that collecting and analysing large amounts of data on elephant locations and migrations can lead to insights into their choices, and therefore assist in their protection against rising threats, including poaching and human-wildlife conflict. Douglas-Hamilton's work is described in the book Among the Elephants written together with his wife Oria, and by Peter Matthiessen in his book The Tree Where Man Was Born.

In an interview years later, Iain said about his time in Manyara – "Nobody had lived with wildlife in Africa and looked at them as individuals yet. I was incredibly lucky to have had the chance to be the first person to do that with elephants."

=== Uganda ===
From 1980 to 1982, Douglas-Hamilton lived in Uganda, where he was made Honorary Chief Park Warden amid the chaos after Idi Amin's fall. He was in charge of anti poaching activities under a project to rehabilitate Uganda's three game parks that was jointly financed by the United Nations and the European Community. His plane was hit several times by gunfire from Sudanese troops who had been poaching animals in Kidepo National Park in northern Uganda. In Murchison Falls, Douglas-Hamilton lived in the restored Queen Mother Lodge originally built for the visit of Queen Mother Elizabeth in the 1950s. In 2022, Douglas-Hamilton returned to Uganda for the first time in forty years as part of a cross-border mission in collaboration with Northern Rangelands Trust and Uganda wildlife authorities, to collar elephants and investigate how they moved and overlapped with local communities.

=== Kenya ===
Douglas-Hamilton moved to Kenya with his family where he continued his conservation work. In 1993, he started Save the Elephants in order to create an effective and flexible NGO dedicated specifically to elephants. He continued to provide key research findings to the international community about poaching and human-elephant conflict, serving on the data review task force of the African Elephant Specialist Group of IUCN, and the Technical Advisory Group for the Monitoring of Illegal Killing of Elephants Programme. He also conducted regular lecture tours and worked with the media to raise awareness of elephants. Additionally, Douglas-Hamilton has spoken at universities, zoological societies, embassies and private fundraising functions throughout Europe and America. His chief research interest was to understand elephant choices by studying their movements.

== Work ==
=== Counting elephants ===
A skilled pilot, Douglas-Hamilton initially developed techniques to monitor widespread elephant movements from the air. In the early 1970s, he designed study methods that would allow for comprehensive and replicable surveys of elephant families from low-flying aircraft, which would at the same time allow large population counts to be undertaken for the first time. Between 1976 and 1979, Douglas-Hamilton worked on a joint IUCN /WWF Elephant Survey and Conservation Programme, which surveyed African elephant populations in 34 countries to produce scientific data to help shape policy recommendations for the species' protection. Around the same time, working for IUCN, Douglas-Hamilton undertook research to map out the scale of the world ivory trade, its value, and its regulations. Meanwhile, he continued to direct aerial surveys of elephant populations into the 1980s, including in Uganda, Tanzania and the Central African Republic.

=== The 'elephant holocaust' and international ivory trade ban ===
Douglas-Hamilton's aerial surveys, coupled with research coming from other studies, began to show for the first time the scale of the poaching crisis that was sweeping Africa during the 1970s and 1980s, as demand for ivory from Asia, in particular from Japan, grew. From 1980 to 1982, Douglas-Hamilton was made Honorary Chief Park Warden in Uganda. Years of poaching and political turmoil, during and after the reign of dictator Idi Amin, had taken its toll on Uganda's national parks – once some of Africa's finest national parks.

By 1980, most of Uganda's elephants had been killed and were down from a probable 20,000 to an estimated 1,600 elephants and declining rapidly. Douglas-Hamilton was then working on a project for the United Nations Development Programme as an anti-poaching advisor to Uganda's national parks. There, he designed air and ground patrols against poachers, many from Sudan, where civil war was raging and poached elephant ivory could be sold to raise money to buy weapons. On occasion, Douglas-Hamilton was shot at as he carried out his work.

His work in Uganda helped to stem the loss of elephants to poachers, and allowed him to propose ways that poachers could be stopped in other parts of Africa, using the methods he developed in Uganda. Douglas-Hamilton's estimates, drawn from his research and that of others, suggested that the population of African elephants across the continent of at least 1.3 million individuals in 1979 had been reduced to less than half, or around 600,000, by 1989.

These statistics illustrated to the world the scale of what became known as the elephant holocaust. Regulation of the trade was attempted, via the Convention on the International Trade in Endangered Species, but eventually it was globally accepted that a ban should be enforced to stem the loss of illegally killed elephants. Douglas-Hamilton was among Africa's leading conservationists who argued for this position. It is widely accepted that the ban worked, and elephant populations, especially savannah populations, began to recover.

=== Save the Elephants ===
The first 20 years of Douglas-Hamilton's work had illustrated that close scientific study of elephant populations, coupled with surveys of their ranges and movements, could help to mould policies that could protect them from external changes. To build on this work, in 1993, Douglas-Hamilton founded Save The Elephants, a charity registered in the UK and headquartered in Nairobi. Its mission – "to secure a future for elephants" by preserving the environments in which the animals live and encouraging a tolerant relationship between elephant and human populations.

Save the Elephants main research station is in Samburu National Reserve in northern Kenya. In 2010, Douglas-Hamilton almost lost the camp when floods completely decimated the research facility and nearby tourist lodges, including Elephant Watch Camp, with beds, tents, computers and vital research documentation submerged in mud and strung up in the treetops.

At a second research station in the Sagalla community in Tsavo, southeastern Kenya, the Human-Elephant Coexistence team is investigating ways for people to live in harmony with elephants in an increasingly crowded landscape.

Since its inception, the organisation, under the direction of Douglas-Hamilton, has conducted research on elephants across Africa and has increased public awareness of the many dangers that threaten elephants and the habitats in which they live. Fundamental to his work at STE, Douglas-Hamilton pioneered GPS tracking of elephants in Africa, which has become a standard and widely emulated survey technique; it also guides the deployment of rangers to protect vulnerable and key elephant populations. In 2007 Douglas-Hamilton partnered with Google Earth to show elephant movement in real time via satellite images.

Collection of scientific data continues to drive Douglas-Hamilton's work with Save the Elephants, both with the aerial surveys that he pioneered early in his career, and increasingly with modern technology including tracking collared elephants by GPS and satellites. Save the Elephants has since its formation been studying herds resident or migratory to Samburu National Reserve, a cohort of roughly 1000 individuals. Hundreds of elephants have been darted and fitted with collars carrying chips that communicate via satellites or mobile telephone networks with the charity's computer databases.

The elephants of Samburu are now one of the best-studied elephant populations in the world, with detailed histories of almost 1,000 individuals and their interactions from more than 25 years of research. Data from their behaviour and population dynamics have allowed scientists to understand the impacts of the ivory poaching crisis on populations across Africa. From the initial collaring and monitoring of herds in Samburu, Douglas-Hamilton and Save the Elephants have gone on to use the same methods to study elephant populations across Africa. In 2016, Douglas-Hamilton announced that Save the Elephants had tracked the first ever elephant bull to cross into Somalia in more than two decades.

Alongside its focus on data collection, Douglas-Hamilton has directed Save the Elephants to increase its work on reducing the conflict between growing human populations and elephant herds. Its Human-Elephant Coexistence program is run by Dr. Lucy King, who completed her doctorate demonstrating elephants' instinctive fear of honey bees under the guidance and mentorship of Douglas-Hamilton. The project utilises beehive fences, with beehives occupied by African bees, to reduce the problem of elephants destroying crops on small farms in Africa and Asia.

In 2013, Save the Elephants launched the Elephant Crisis Fund in partnership with the US-based Wildlife Conservation Network to provide flexible and responsive support to NGOs combatting the ivory trade, promoting human-elephant coexistence, and protecting elephant landscapes. The Elephant Crisis Fund has disbursed more than $36m to hundreds of organisations in more than 40 countries.

In his role as founder and president of Save the Elephants, Douglas-Hamilton ran field projects including elephant surveys, radio-tracking, community conservation projects, and ivory studies, wildlife protection, scientific publication, and international representation.

== The poaching crisis ==
Douglas-Hamilton, and others, argue that 'one-off' sales of seized ivory stockpiled by the governments of South Africa, Zimbabwe, Namibia and Botswana to China and Japan in 2002 and 2008 kick-started a return of uncontrolled illegal poaching of Africa's elephants that is "far graver" even than during the 1970s and 1980s. Douglas-Hamilton and others estimate that between 2010 and 2012, more than 100,000 African elephants were illegally killed. The increased price of ivory was to blame with the price paid for elephant tusks after 2007 doubling around the Samburu National Reserve area.

Douglas-Hamilton testified in 2012 to the Committee on Foreign Relations at the US Senate as part of high-level investigations into the links between resurgent ivory poaching in Africa and insecurity. The price of ivory in markets in China, especially, and Asia generally, had also increased, driven by demand from growing middle classes keen to display their wealth, and speculators hoarding ivory against expected price rises following a new trade ban, or the extinction of the African elephant.

Douglas-Hamilton, echoing colleagues in the field, highlighted to the US Senate committee that current poaching trends could only be stemmed with increased anti-poaching efforts in African range states, better enforcement of laws against poaching, smuggling and money-laundering, and campaigns to reduce the demand for ivory products in Asia.

Iain's high level meeting at the White House was followed in 2013 by both the Obama Executive Order, and the Clinton Global Initiative Commitment to action to Stop the Killing, Stop the Trafficking and Stop the Demand for ivory. That same year the first detailed analysis on the impacts of illegal killing on an elephant population was published by Save the Elephants by PLOS One.

A natural raconteur, Douglas-Hamilton has rubbed shoulders with many key figures in the world of politics, film, sports, fashion and music - all in the name of protecting Africa's wild elephants. In 2012, Douglas-Hamilton and Save The Elephants worked with WildAid, an American charity dedicated to reducing the demand for products from endangered animals, to host Yao Ming, one of China's best-known sports personalities, during a fact-finding tour of Kenya. His campaign and others in China have helped to reduce the demand for ivory products, according to surveys.

In 2013, the Clinton Global Initiative, part of the Clinton's charitable foundation, announced an $80 million program to protect Africa's elephants and end ivory trafficking, in coordination with several conservation groups including Save the Elephants and Douglas-Hamilton. Two years later, former President Bill Clinton and his daughter, Chelsea, visited Save the Elephants in Samburu on a fact-finding mission and met with Douglas-Hamilton to witness first-hand the enormous poaching threat facing elephants in the area.

In 2015, Save the Elephants published new research showing the price of illegal raw ivory in China has almost halved bringing hope that the slaughter of elephants would be reduced across Africa.

Thanks in part to the enormous and impactful lobbying efforts of Douglas-Hamilton and Save the Elephants, China announced it would end its domestic ivory trade in December 2017. The ban came into effect in 2018.

Douglas-Hamilton said "My hope is to secure a future for elephants in perpetuity, and I think it's a challenge because we haven't calmed down as a species, our numbers are increasing, and our demands on the environment are increasing. We want more of everything — more roads, more space, we want to carve up more forests, so there's a big threat and a big challenge. My dream would be for human beings to come into balance with their environment, to stop destroying nature."

== Awards, works and publications ==
Douglas-Hamilton was the recipient of many awards for his research and his work to protect Africa's elephants, including the 2010 Indianapolis Prize, a major global award for animal conservation, for which he had previously been a finalist in 2006 and 2008. He also received the George B Rabb Conservation Medal of the Chicago Zoological Society in 2014 and the Disney Wildlife Conservation Fund Award in 2006.

In 2015, he was appointed a Commander of the British Empire and was presented with the Lifetime Achievement Award by San Diego Zoological Society In 2025, Douglas-Hamilton and Dr Jake Wall were awarded the Esmond B. Martin Royal Geographical Society Prize, which recognises outstanding individual achievement in the pursuit and application of geographical research, with a particular emphasis on wildlife conservation and environmental research studies.

Douglas-Hamilton was a member of the Technical Advisory Group to CITES for monitoring the illegal killing of elephants (MIKE) in Africa, a trustee of the Kenya Elephant Research Fund, a member from 1982 of the IUCN African Elephant Specialist Group, and later a member of its African Elephant Data Review Working Group. From 1993 to 2004, he was a wildlife and environmental consultant to the European Union.

Douglas-Hamilton published a long list of academic research papers throughout his career. He was the author, with his wife Oria, of Battle for the Elephants (Viking, 1992) and Among The Elephants (Doubleday, 1975).

== Books ==
- Battle for the Elephants (Viking, 1992). ISBN 0-6708-4003-3.
- Among the Elephants (DoubleDay 1975). ISBN 0-6701-2208-4.

== Films ==
- The Family that Lives with Elephants (Narrated by David Niven) (1973)
- Ivory Wars (1989)
- Africa's Elephant Kingdom (1998)
- The Secret Life of Elephants (2009)
- This Wild Life (2015)
- A Life Among Elephants (2024)
