= Flagon =

Large vessel for holding liquid

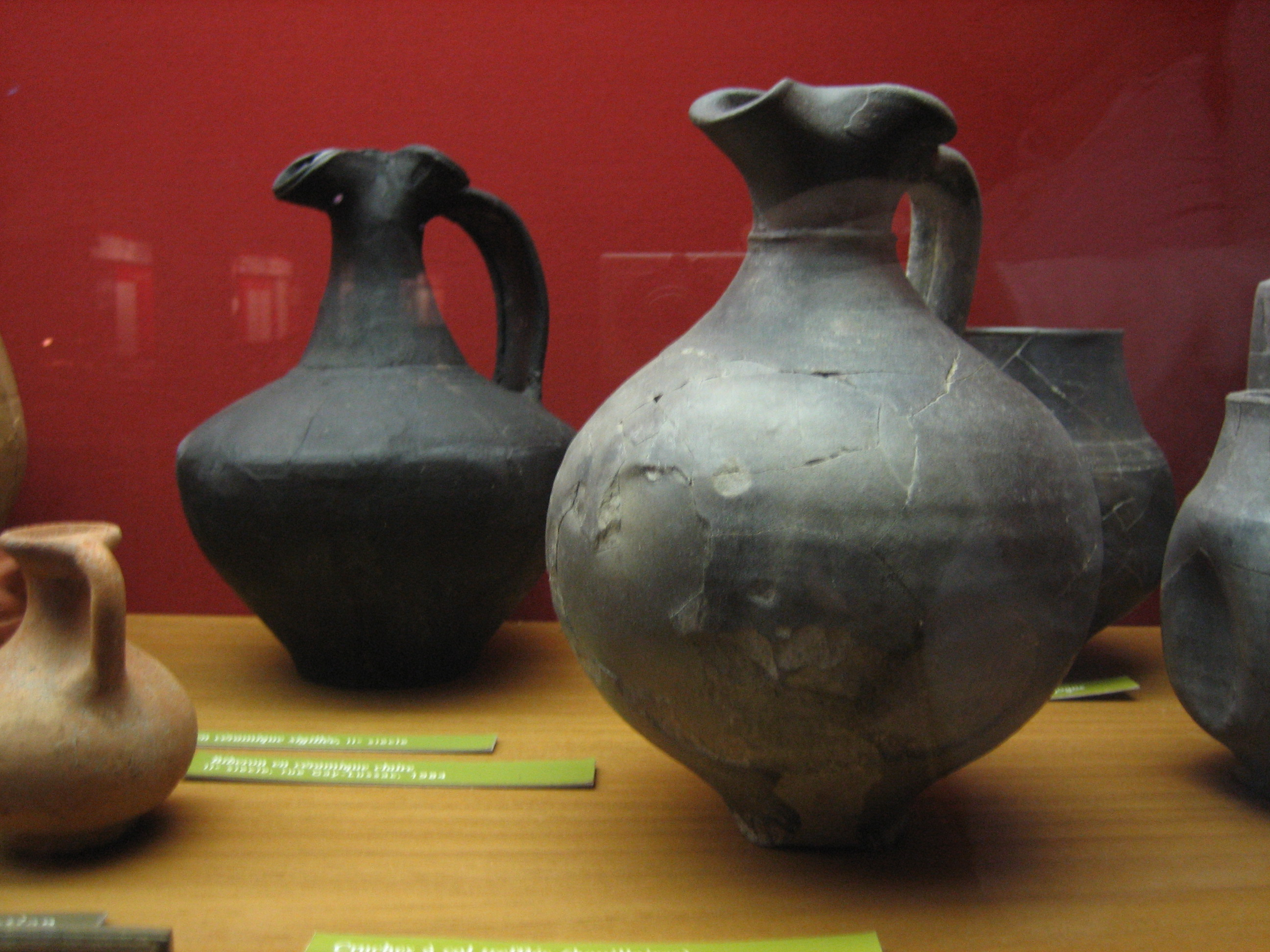
Ancient Roman earthenware flagons

A flagon (/ˈflæɡən/) is a large leather, metal, glass, plastic or ceramic vessel, used for storing and pouring drink, whether this be water, ale, or another liquid. They are generally not intended to be drunk from directly, like a cup or tankard. A flagon is typically about 2 imperial pints (1.1 L) in volume, and it has either a handle (when strictly it is a jug), or (more usually) one or two rings at the neck. Sometimes the neck has a large flange at the top rather than rings. The neck itself may or may not be formed into one, two or three spouts. The name comes from the same origin as the word "flask".

== Christian use ==
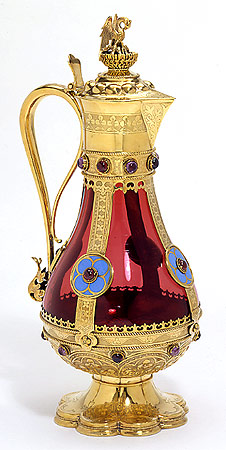
Hardman & Co. communion flagon from the mid-19th century

As a Roman Catholic term of use, the flagon is the large vessel, usually glass and metal, that holds the wine. Before March 2002, a flagon may have also been used to hold the wine during the consecration of the Eucharist and then be poured into many chalices. This pouring of sacramental wine from flagon to chalice was eliminated. A smaller container called a cruet is used for the priest's chalice, usually identical to the cruet of water, which is mingled with the wine before consecration. The cruets do not remain on the altar after the preparation of the gifts.

In the Evangelical-Lutheran Churches, the flagon typically has the design of the pelican engraved on it, or "the vine and its fruit". The flagon is made of gold.

In the Anglican Church, the flagon is the vessel that contains the wine to be consecrated. If more than one chalice is used during the administration of Communion, the flagon (or an additional cruet filled with wine and water) is placed on the altar at the Offertory, and other chalices are brought to the altar after the Breaking of the Bread. There should be only one chalice on the altar during the Great Thanksgiving.

== New Zealand ==
In New Zealand, a flagon refers to a glass vessel filled with beer available in public bars or bottle stores. Drinkers could take their own washed flagons or swap their empties for those pre-filled, corked, and ready for sale. The flagon was followed by the half-gallon (2.27 L) jar and was preceded by the square rigger and the bluey. These were commonly used during the period of six-o'clock closing of bars. A flagon can hold different volumes of beer or wine and is thought to have originated from an amendment to the licensing laws, which took effect in 1881. The amendment allowed winemakers to sell wine from their vineyards for off-license consumption, so long as the quantity was 2 imperial gallons (9.1 liters) or more (hence the "2 g" flagon). Before this change winemakers could only sell wine from hotels. A half-gallon flagon was a common volume used for beer.
