= St Andrews Prize for the Environment =

- Awarded for: Significant contributions to environmental concerns and issues
- Sponsored by: University of St Andrews; ConocoPhillips (until 2020)
- Country: Scotland, United Kingdom
- Presented by: University of St Andrews
- Rewards: US$100,000 and Medal
- First award: 1998; 28 years ago
- Website: www.st-andrews.ac.uk/st-andrews-prize/

The St Andrews Prize for the Environment is a prestigious international environmental award funded and administered by the University of St Andrews in Scotland, United Kingdom. Prior to 2020, the American exploration and production company ConocoPhillips sponsored the prize.

The award recognises significant contributions to environmental issues and concerns aligned to the Sustainable Development Goals. Applications are invited from individuals, multi-disciplinary teams or community groups. The winning environmental project receives funding of US$100,000 and each of the two runners-up receive US$25,000.

The current Chair of the judging panel is the President of the Royal Society of Biology, Sir Ian Boyd having taken over the role from the CEO of the Royal Academy of Engineering, Hayaatun Sillem.

== List of Winners ==
List of winners has been taken from the St Andrews Prize website:

=== 2019—Present ===
Year	Region Served	Winner	Initiative	URL
2024	India	Kham River Restoration Mission	Waterway management project aiming to restore seasonal flow of a river that runs through Aurangabad.	
2023	Ecuador	Alianza Ceibo	Empowers indigenous populations of the Upper Amazon in South America to conserve rainforest territories and preserve local cultures.	
2022	Costa Rica	Misión Tiburón	Community-based project to protect and restore blue carbon sinks in the Hammerhead Shark Sanctuary.	
2021	Finland	Snowchange Cooperative	A landscape rewilding programme which incorporates indigenous knowledge to tackle ecosystems affected by climate change, especially peatlands, in the Arctic and boreal areas of Finland.	
2020	Uganda	Conservation Through Public Health	A project which takes a multi-faceted approach to conservation integrating approaches addressing biodiversity conservation, health advances and livelihood improvements for local communities.	
2019	India	Saathi	Using agricultural waste to create a biodegradable menstruation product for women in parts of rural India.	

=== 2009—2018 ===
Year	Region Served	Winner	Initiative	URL
2018	Peru	The Mountain Institute	Restoration of an ancestral water system to tackle water scarcity issues in the Nor-Yauyos Cochas Landscape Reserve of Peru.	
2017	Kenya	Plantwise	Improving information dissemination to reduce reliance on harmful pesticides, increase crop yields and to improve food security.	
2016	Brazil	Liter of Light	An innovative source of light which involves refracting light from a solution in a plastic bottle to brighten homes and produce no carbon emissions.	
2015	Guinea	Wild Chimpanzee Foundation	A multi-level conservation project, which aims to protect the largest remaining population of wild Chimpanzees on the Foutah Djallon-Bafing River (FDBR) region in Guinea, West Africa.	
2014	Madagascar	Blue Ventures	Empowering local communities in southwest Madagascar to protect their marine environment and manage their resources sustainably by integrating holistic community-based health services within local biodiversity conservation initiatives.	
2013	Kenya	Elephants and Bees	Project developed from the behavioural discovery that honey bees can be used as a natural deterrent to crop raiding elephants.	
2012	Kenya	Lion Guardians	Thirty-two non-literate Maasai warriors in Kenya were trained and employed as community conservationists and field biologists.	
2011	India	Biolite	An innovative cookstove, which provides improved air quality and a clean economic source of electricity inside the home.	
2010	India	Bhaskar Sen Gupta	An innovative method of removing arsenic from groundwater without using chemicals.	—N/a
2009	China	One Earth Designs	For the development of a high-performance solar cooker (SolSource) to meet the needs of Himalayan villagers. The SolSource 3-in-1 project aims to supply clean energy for cooking, heating, and thermo-electricity generation to high-altitude low-income communities.	

=== 1999—2008 ===
Year	Region Served	Winner	Initiative	URL
2008	Malawi	Ian Thorpe	The Elephant Toilet provides an innovative and sustainable sanitation solution which could benefit millions of people across Africa, and beyond.	
2007	Philippines	David Manalo	River, Fibre and Power Project providing sustainable lighting services in remote locations in the Philippines.	—N/a
2006	Guatemala	Erika Vohman	Promoting the use of Maya nut in Central America.	
2005	Zimbabwe	Pump Aid	Creation of the Elephant Pump, a pump built using simple technology and locally available materials.	
2004	Peru	Conrad Feather	Deployment of GPS and other similar technologies to enable the Nahua people of Peru to map and better understand the land they live on.	—N/a
2003	India	Bunker Roy	Founding of the Barefoot College in Rajasthan to train semi-literate and non-literate women to spread solar energy in remote Himalayan villages.	
2002	Vietnam	Monina Escalada	In collaboration with the International Rice Research institute of the Philippines, rice farmers in Northern Vietnam were persuaded to limit usage of insecticides.	—N/a
2001	Kenya	George Odera Outa	A team from the University of Nairobi led by Outa developed a community education project to combat the environmental hazards that affect Lake Victoria.	—N/a
2000	Palestine	Hikmat Hilal and Amer El-Hamouz	A team from An-Najah National University in the West Bank put forward a proposal to turn the waste from olive oil production into useful by-products.	—N/a
1999	South Africa	Daniel Limpitlaw	Limpitlaw's work on further understanding the links between early mining developments and subsequent environmental degradation.	—N/a

== See also ==
- List of environmental awards
