= Save the Elephants =

UK conservation charity

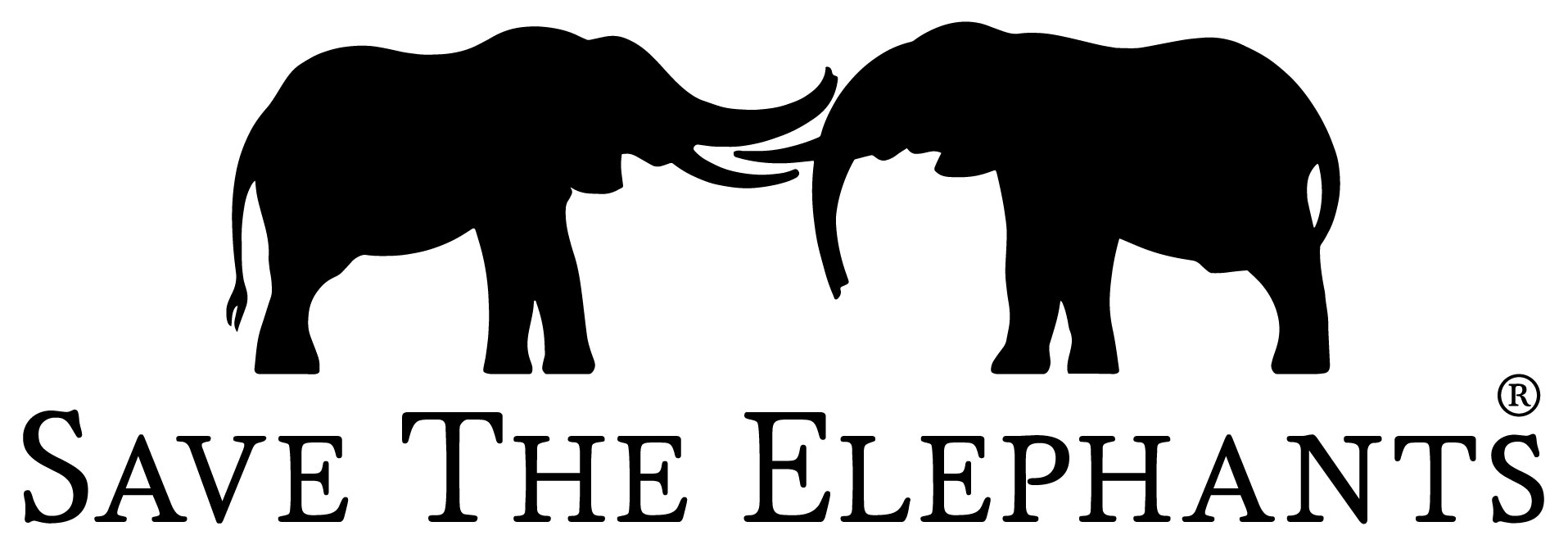
- Formation: 1993; 33 years ago
- Founder: Iain Douglas-Hamilton
- Type: Nonprofit
- Purpose: Wildlife conservation
- Location: Kenya, Africa
- Region served: Based in Kenya, projects across the continent
- Staff: 80
- Volunteers: 5
- Website: www.savetheelephants.org

Save the Elephants (STE) is a research and conservation organization, founded in 1993 by Iain Douglas-Hamilton. It is a UK-registered charity headquartered in Nairobi, with its principal research station in Samburu National Reserve in northern Kenya.

STE's mission is to secure a future for elephants and sustain the beauty and ecological integrity of the places they live, to promote man's delight in their intelligence and the diversity of their world, and to develop a tolerant relationship between the two species.

The elephants of Samburu are now one of the best-studied elephant populations in the world, with detailed histories of almost 1,000 individuals and their interactions over the last 29 years. Data from their behaviour and population dynamics have allowed scientists to understand the impacts of the ivory poaching crisis on populations across Africa.

STE utilizes radio and GPS tracking to collect real-time information on elephants' movements, which is used in efforts to protect herds from poachers. In addition, the long-term data is used to influence landscape planning with respect to elephant habitats.

In 2013, STE launched the Elephant Crisis Fund, run jointly with the Wildlife Conservation Network. Its stated goal is to support organizations that aim to reduce the elephant poaching and trafficking of ivory. Since then, the ECF has funded 104 partners, conducting 415 projects in 44 countries across Africa and Asia. According to the organization, 100% of the funds raised have been directed to field projects.
