= Ali Bouhamad =

Ali Bouhamad علي بوحمد
- Born: 1992 (age 33–34); Kuwait
- Occupation: Eulogy reciter
- Years active: 2012–present

Ali Ahmed Al Bouhamad (Arabic: علي أحمد آل بوحمد; b. 1992), known as Ali Bouhamad or Ali Bohamad, is an Islamic eulogy reciter, music producer and composer from Kuwait.

== Biography ==
Bouhamad was born in the city of Kuwait. He hails from a Ahsa'i family that migrated to Kuwait in the late 19th-century. Bouhamad grew up within a conservative religious family, that founded a Hussainiya of their own in 1952, known as Hussainiyat Al Buhamad (The Hussainiya of the family of Bouhamad).

He began reciting in local Hussainiyas in Kuwait, namely his family's Hussainiya. Then as he began to gain fame, he began to get invited to recite across the Islamic world. He released his first album single in 2017, gaining millions of views to his video clips on his YouTube channel. His elegies have been featured on various religious TV channels and aired on a number of religious radio broadcasts.

He recites frequently in Kuwait, Iraq, London, Oman, and Saudi Arabia, and has previously recited in Sweden, and Lebanon.

== Discography ==
=== Studio albums ===
- Hayat w Mowt (Life and Death) (2019)
- Hikaya (The Story) (2020)
- Ya Malik Hel Omor (My all) (2021)
- Kol al Toroq (All Roads) (2022)
- Sayyidi Ya Husayn (My master Husayn) (2023)

=== Music videos ===
| Year | Title | Director | Views | Source |
|---|---|---|---|---|
| 2017 | "Mafroodh 'Al Naas" | Mohammad Adel Bloshi | 3.2 million | Ali Bouhamad's Youtube Channel |
| 2017 | "My Service" | Abbas Saeed | 22 million | Ali Bouhamad's Youtube Channel |
| 2018 | "My Soul" | Abbas Saeed | 1.8 million | Ali Bouhamad's Youtube Channel |
| 2019 | "Dhaye'" | Abbas Saeed | 2.1 million | Ali Bouhamad's Youtube Channel |
| 2020 | "A'tham Areesayn" | Abbas Saeed | 28 million | Ali Bouhamad's Youtube Channel |
| 2020 | "My First Love" | Hussain Bahman | 8.1 million | Ali Bouhamad's Youtube Channel |
| 2021 | "Min al-Mutamasakeen" | Abbas Saeed | 8.4 million | Ali Bouhamad's Youtube Channel |
| 2021 | "He Attacked" | Mohammad Adel Bloshi | 2.4 million | Ali Bouhamad's Youtube Channel |
| 2021 | "My All" | Abd al-Zahra | 5.8 million | Ali Bouhamad's Youtube Channel |
| 2021 | "Salallah Alayh Wa Alih" | Hussain Bahman | 1.9 million | Ali Bouhamad's Youtube Channel |
| 2022 | "All Roads" | Mohammed Esfandiari | 1 million | Ali Bouhamad's Youtube Channel |
| 2023 | "Sayyid Ya Husayn" | Aiman Alwaeli | 2.5 million | Ali Bouhamad's Youtube Channel |
| 2024 | "14 Masoom" | Abbas Yousefi | 11 million | Ali Bouhamad's Youtube Channel |
| 2024 | "Huwal Hussain" | Mohammed Adel Bloshi | 2.7 million | Ali Bouhamad's Youtube Channel |
| 2024 | "Akhir Kalam" | Khalid Buzayd | 1.7 million | Ali Bouhamad's Youtube Channel |
| 2025 | "My Divine Beloved" | Ahmed Jafar | 3.7 million | Ali Bouhamad's Youtube Channel |

== Muharram Participations ==
Muharram Participation's
| Gregorian Year | Lunar Year | Organisation | Location |
|---|---|---|---|
| 2017 | 1439 | Al-Akbar Foundation | London, UK |
| 2018 | 1440 | Hussainiyat Sayyid al-Shuhada | Kuwait |
| 2019 | 1441 | Hussainiyat Sayyid al-Shuhada | Kuwait |
| 2020 | 1442 | Hussainiyat Sayyid al-Shuhada | Kuwait |
| 2021 | 1443 | Hussainiyat al-Imamayn al-Kadhimayn | Kuwait |
| 2022 | 1444 | Hey'at Ayn al-Hayat | Manama, Bahrain |
| 2023 | 1445 | Al-Akbar Foundation | London, UK |
| 2024 | 1446 | Hussainiyat Sayyid al-Shuhada | Kuwait |
| 2025 | 1447 | Hussain Unites Us Association | Kuwait |

== Personal life ==
Bouhamad was married and has three children. His wife, died due to a vehicular accident in Kuwait, near the Kuwait-Iraq border, as she was on her way to make pilgrimage in Iraq, on Saturday, July 20th, 2024.

== See also ==
- Basim al-Karbalaei
- Hussain Faisal
