= Hussain Faisal =

Hussain Faisal حسين فيصل
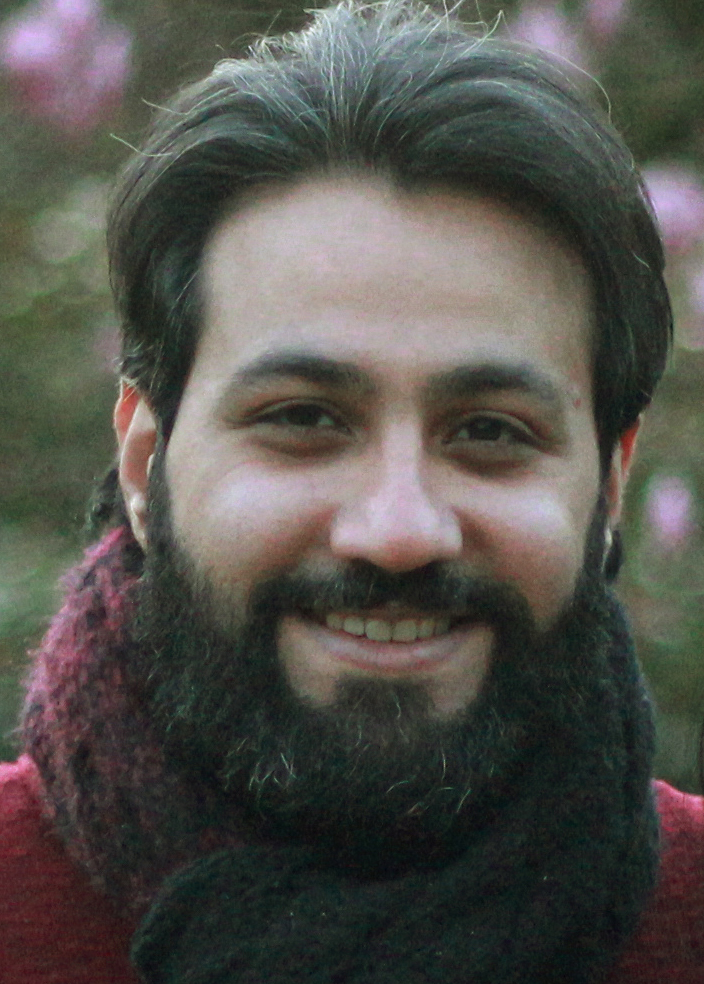

Background information
- Born: 1986 (age 39–40); Bani Jamra, Bahrain
- Occupation: Eulogy reciter
- Years active: 2014–present

Hussain Faisal Al Marzooq (Arabic: حسين فيصل المرزوق; b. 1986), simply known as Hussain Faisal, is an Islamic eulogy reciter, music producer and composer from Bahrain.

== Early life ==
Faisal was born in the city of Bani Jamra, Bahrain. He is the third of five children. He graduated with a BBIS from the University of Bahrain.

== Career ==
Faisal started his music production and arrangement career focusing on Islamic music productions mainly in Arabic, in the start of the millennium. He also participated in general vocal coaching from time to time.

He started his Islamic recitation career in the early a few years later, and in 2014, released his first album (Ard Anishdak) gaining millions of views to his video clips on his YouTube channel. His elegies have been featured on various Islamic TV channels and aired on few Islamic radio broadcasts as well.

He recites frequently between Bahrain and Iraq, and has previously recited in Oman, Saudi Arabia, London, Lebanon and Iran.

== Discography ==
=== Studio albums ===
- Ard Anishdak (2014)
- Ithkirni (2015)
- Omri Ibla Wujudak
- Ya Muharram (2016)
- Tistahil Akthar
- Qisati

== See also ==
- Basim al-Karbalaei
- Muharram in Bahrain
