= Saxons =

Medieval cultural group from what is now Northern Germany

Sahson
- The Stem Duchy of Saxony

Regions with significant populations
- Old Saxony, Frisia, England, Normandy

Languages
- Old Saxon

Religion
- Originally Germanic and Anglo-Saxon paganism, later Christianity

Related ethnic groups
- Anglo-Saxons, Angles, Frisii, Jutes, Franks

The Saxons, sometimes called the Old Saxons or Continental Saxons, were a Germanic people of early medieval "Old" Saxony (Latin: Antiqua Saxonia) which became a Carolingian "stem duchy" in 804, in what is now northern Germany. Many of their neighbours were, like them, speakers of West Germanic dialects, including both the Franks and Thuringians to the south, and the coastal Frisians, Angles and Danes to the north who were among the peoples who were originally referred to as "Saxons" in the context of early raiding and settlements in Roman Britain and Gaul. To their east were Obotrites and other Slavic-speaking peoples.

The political history of these continental Saxons is unclear until the 8th century and the conflict between their semi-legendary hero Widukind and the Frankish emperor Charlemagne. The earliest possible record is a single classical reference to Saxons north of the mouth of the Elbe in the second century AD, but the interpretation of this text ("Axones" in most surviving manuscripts) is disputed. For historians who accept this record, the original Saxon tribe lived close to the probable homeland of the Angles, in a region became part of Old Saxony under the name of Nordalbingia. The first undoubted usage of the term "Saxons" came centuries later, in the third to fifth centuries, when it was used for to coastal raiders who attacked the Roman Empire from north of the Rhine. However, scholars believe the term was then being used something like the much later term Viking, and was probably not a term for any specific tribe. These early raiders eventually included Frisians, Angles, and Jutes, as well as the Anglo-Saxons who became established in Britain.

The continental Saxons first appeared as inland opponents of the Franks in the sixth century, after Frankish victories over Thuringian and Warini kingdoms about which little is known. These Saxons do not appear to have been politically united until the generations of conflict leading up to their defeat by Charlemagne, before which they were reportedly ruled by regional "satraps". Frankish rulers of Austrasia, both Merovingian and Carolingian, fought numerous campaigns against Saxons, both in the west near the Lippe, Ems and Weser, and further east, near Thuringia and Bohemia, including the area which later medieval sources referred to as "North Swabia". Charlemagne conquered all the Saxons after winning the long Saxon Wars (772–804 AD) and forced them to convert to Christianity, annexing Saxony into the Carolingian domain. Under the Carolingian Franks Saxony became a single Stem duchy, fitting it within the basic political structure of the later Holy Roman Empire. The early rulers of this Duchy of Saxony expanded their territories—and therefore those of the Holy Roman Empire—to the east, at the expense of Slavic-speaking Wends.

Today the Saxons of Germany no longer form a distinctive ethnic group or country, but their name lives on in the names of several regions and states of Germany, including Lower Saxony (German: Niedersachsen) which includes most of the original duchy. Their language evolved into Low German which was the lingua franca of the Hanseatic League, but has faced a long and gradual decline since the Late Medieval period as a literary, administrative and, to a significant extent, cultural language in favor of Dutch and German.

== The name of the Saxons ==
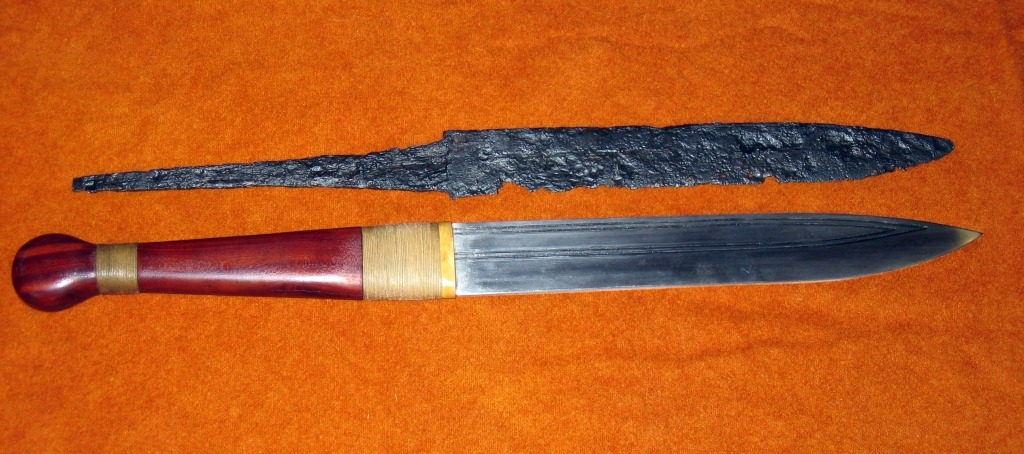
The remains of a seax together with a reconstructed replica

The name of the Saxons has traditionally been said to derive from a kind of knife used in this period and called a seax in Old English and sahs in Old High German. The term "Saxon" was first definitely used in written records to describe coastal raiders who attacked the Roman Empire from regions north of the Rhine using boats. At this time, the term had a similar sense to the much later term "Viking". These early raiders and settlers called Saxons included Frisians, Angles and Jutes, whose countries stretched from what is now the Netherlands to what is now Denmark, and included coastal parts of the territory which came to be called Saxony. It has been proposed that these coastal Saxons, who were strongly associated with the Anglo-Saxons of England, should be seen as distinct from the later Saxons of Carolingian times, although they were referred to by the same name, and were clearly related peoples. This has been compared to the later evolution of modern European terms referring to the "Dutch people" of the Netherlands, and the Deutschen, or Germans, of neighbouring Germany.

Significant numbers of these early Saxons settled within the empire, in what later became northern France and England. England, rather than Saxony, was sometimes written of as the Saxon homeland. To avoid confusion, later writers in the 8th century such as Bede and the author of the Ravenna Cosmography referred to the Saxons of Saxony in Germany as the "old Saxons", and their country as "old Saxony", and this differentiation is still often used by historians today when discussing this period. In contrast, the settlers once called Saxons in England became part of a new Old English-speaking nation, now commonly referred to as the Anglo-Saxons, or simply "the English". This brought together local Romano-British populations, Saxons, and other migrants from the same North Sea region, including Frisians, Jutes, and Angles. The Angles are the source of the term "English" which became the more commonly used collective term. The term "Anglo-Saxon", combining the names of the Angles and the Saxons, also came into use by the 8th century, initially in the work of Paul the Deacon, to distinguish the Germanic-speaking inhabitants of Britain from continental Saxons. However, both the Saxons of Britain and those of Old Saxony in northern Germany long continued to be referred to as "Saxons" in an indiscriminate manner.

== History ==
=== Possible mention in Ptolemy (2nd century AD) ===
Map of the Roman Empire and contemporary indigenous Europe in 125 AD, showing the location of the Saxons in Northern Germany, according to some copies of Ptolemy's work

Ptolemy's Geographia, written in the 2nd century, is sometimes considered to contain the first mention of the Saxons. Some copies of this text mention a tribe called Saxones in the area just to the north of the lower Elbe, and there were also three islands north of the Elbe's mouth which were called the Saxon islands. However, other versions refer to the same tribe as Axones. Some scholars such as Mathias Springer have proposed that this may be a misspelling of the tribe that Tacitus in his Germania called Aviones. According to this theory, Saxones was the result of later scribes trying to correct a name that meant nothing to them. On the other hand, Schütte, in his analysis of such problems in Ptolemy's Maps of Northern Europe, believed that Saxones is correct. He notes that the loss of first letters occurs in numerous places in various copies of Ptolemy's work, and also that the manuscripts without Saxones are generally inferior overall. According to Liccardo "Even though the reference is found in a section of the Geographia difficult to interpret, the scholarly consensus considers this passage to be genuine".

For the majority of scholars who accept the existence of Saxons in Ptolemy, their reappearance as a much more important and widespread people in third century records is nonetheless remarkable.

=== Saxon raiders (3rd and 4th centuries) ===
The first clear and undisputed contemporary uses of the Saxon name come from the 4th century, but some of these refer to events in the 3rd century. After Ptolemy, the next oldest mention of the Saxons is the Laterculus Veronensis from about 314 AD, which mentions the Saxons in a list of barbarian peoples outside the empire, who had flourished under its hegemony. Within this list they are clearly distinguished from neighbouring groups including the Chamavi and Franci. In contrast, the term Saxon does not appear in any of the 3rd century Latin panegyrics.

Eutropius, a 4th-century Roman historian, claimed that Saxon and Frankish raiders had attacked the North Sea coast near Boulogne-sur-Mer in about 285, when Carausius was posted there to defend against them. However, it is very likely that Saxon was a new term he was using anachronistically. Some of the Panegyrici Latini were written soon after those events, but they instead mention Franks, Chamavi and Frisians, and not Saxons. The panegyrics indicated that these and possibly others entered the Rhine and Scheldt deltas within the empire and held control of it for decades. They imply that the Chamavi and Frisians were seen as types of Franks at this time, rather than Saxons. The area was brought under Roman governance by Constantius Chlorus, who settled many of the conquered in underpopulated parts of Gaul. Constantius also eventually defeated the rebel Carausius in Britain, and his Roman forces are said to have slaughtered barbarian mercenaries there and "those who lately imitated the barbarian in their mode of dress and flowing red hair".

It is not clear when the Roman military structure known as the Litus Saxonicum ('Saxon Shore') was first built or referred to with this name. It was composed of nine forts stretching around the south-eastern corner of England. On the other side of the English Channel two coastal military commands were created, over the Tractus Armoricanus in what is now Brittany and Normandy, and the coast of Belgica Secunda in what later became Flanders and Picardy. The Notitia Dignitatum of about 400 shows that it existed by that time and also lists the existence of a Saxon military unit (an Ala) in the Roman military, which was stationed in what is now Lebanon and northern Israel. This Ala primum Saxonum already existed by 363 when Julian used them in Arabia against the Persian empire. Roman military accessories are found in northern Germany in the 4th and 5th centuries apparently indicating the return of soldiers who had served the empire.

Before becoming emperor himself, Julian the Apostate mentioned the Saxons in a speech as close allies of the rebel emperor Magnentius in 350. Julian described the Saxons and Franks as kinsmen of Magnentius, living "beyond the Rhine and on the shores of the western sea". In 357/8, Julian apparently came into conflict with Saxons when he campaigned in the Rhine regions against Alemanni, Franks, and Saxons. The late 5th-century historian Zosimus reported the involvement of the Saxons, "who exceed all the barbarians in those regions, in courage, strength and hardiness". They sent out, according to Zosimus, the "Quadi", a part of the Saxons, against the Roman lands, but they were blocked by the Franks who resided near them. These "Quadi" therefore used boats to get around the Franks, and made it to Batavia (Betuwe) in the Rhine delta. Scholars generally believe the name "Quadi" to be a mistake, perhaps by a copyist. Based upon other more contemporary reports of these campaigns, it appears that he was referring to the Chamavi, who were however normally listed as Franks. This implies that the term "Saxon" was probably not a clear ethnic distinction at this time, but perhaps rather designated groups who attacked by boat.

Several more records mentioning 4th-century Saxons can be dated:

- The 4th-century historian Ammianus Marcellinus (books 26 and 27) reports that Britain was troubled by the Scoti, two tribes of Picts (the Dicalydones and Verturiones), the Attacotti and the Saxons. Roman officer Count Theodosius led a successful campaign to recover control in Britain. In an inscription preserved in Stobi in North Macedonia, Theodosius is described as the terror of Saxony. This is the earliest known reference to a country of the Saxons apart from the disputed mention by Ptolemy, but this Saxony might have been in Britain. A poetic account of his battle with the Saxons even associates this conflict with the "Orcades", possibly the Orkney islands off Scotland, but it also associates the Picts with "Thule" and Theodosius probably also battled Saxons in the Rhine delta region.
- In Gaul in 370 (Ammianus, books 28 and 30), the Saxons "overcoming the dangers of the Ocean advanced at rapid pace towards the Roman frontier" invading the maritime districts in Gaul. Emperor Valentinian's forces tricked and overwhelmed them, by a "device which was treacherous but expedient", "and stripped of their booty the robbers thus forcibly crushed had almost returned enriched with the spoils which they took".
- In 373, Saxons were defeated at a place called Deuso which was in Frankish, but not Roman territory. This was therefore probably an early mention of an inland force of Saxons.
- Not long before Emperor Magnus Maximus died in 388, according to Bishop Ambrose of Milan, he was attacked by Franks and Saxons as divine retribution for his rebuilding of a synagogue that was burned-down in Rome.
- In 393, Saxons died as gladiators in Rome.

In many cases, the Saxons were associated with using boats for their raids, although the first mentions also involve attacks within the Rhine-Maas delta region. Special mentions of the fearful 4th-century Saxon coastal surprise attacks were made not only by Ammianus, but also by the poet Claudian.

An early rough mention of a country of continental Saxons north of the Rhine was given by Hilarion (291-371), who says that the Frankish homeland lay between the Saxons and Alemanni, therefore placing them north of the Franks.

=== 5th century ===
In the 5th century, the records mentioning Saxons mainly link them with Britain and Gaul. It is likely that the term Saxon was still mainly being used to describe northern raiders in general, and not a specific people. The reputation for shocking coastal raids continued. In the late 5th century a dramatic description of Saxon raiding was written by Sidonius Apollinaris writing to a friend who was assigned to a coastal defensive post in Saintonge near Bordeaux.

Writing in the Byzantine Empire in the 6th century, Procopius describes only three large nations living in "Brittia", Angles, Frisians, and Britons, and he does not mention Saxons at all. Between the Rhine and southern Denmark Procopius believed there was a kingdom of the Warini.

Early in the fifth century it is believed that the Roman general Stilicho campaigned in Britain and northern Gaul and reorganized the defences against the Saxons. Later in his career a series of crises in Italy, Gaul, Iberia and North Africa meant that military resources were not available for Britain. According to the Chronica Gallica of 452, which was probably written in present day southern France, Britain was ravaged by Saxon invaders in 409 or 410. The Romano-British citizens reportedly expelled their Roman officials during this period and never again re-joined the Roman Empire. Procopius states that after the overthrow of Constantine III in 411, "the Romans never succeeded in recovering Britain, but it remained from that time under tyrants."

In 441–442, Saxons are mentioned in the Chronica Gallica of 452 which says that the "British provinces, which to this time had suffered various defeats and misfortunes, are reduced to Saxon rule". 6th-century British historian Gildas apparently knew of these same events from his grandparents' generation. According to Gildas a Saxon force based in the east of Britain (Bede writing in the 8th century believed they were based on the Isle of Thanet) were invited as foederati to Britain, in order to help defend against raids by Picts and Scots. They revolted over their pay and plundered the whole country, initiating a long war which the Romano-British eventually won. However, Britain was divided into corrupt "tyrannies". There are very few records of the period, but by the time of Bede most of England was ruled by Anglo-Saxon kingdoms.

In what is now France, during the 460s, an apparent fragment of a chronicle preserved in the History of the Franks of Gregory of Tours, gives a confusing report about a number of battles involving one "Adovacrius", who led a group of Saxons based upon islands somewhere near the Loire. He took hostages at Anger in France, but his force was subsequently retaken by Roman and Frankish forces led by Childeric I, a Frank. A "great war was waged between the Saxons and the Romans but the Saxons, turning their backs, with the Romans pursuing, lost many of their men to the sword. Their islands were captured and ravaged by the Franks, many people being killed." Though there is no consensus, many historians believe that this Adovacrius may be the same person as Odoacer, the future king of Italy, who is mentioned in the same part of Gregory's text as a person who subsequently allied with Childeric to fight Alemanni in Italy.

=== Merovingian period ===
In comparison to mentions of the early Saxon raiders and settlers in Britain or Gaul, there are few mentions of the Saxons in Germany before the 8th century. Interpretation of the records is also complicated not only by the continuing references to the other Saxons, but also because the Saxons living in present day Germany probably weren't originally unified within one Saxon political entity. It is therefore not clear whether some early continental "Saxons" could also sometimes have come under other designations such as Warini, Frisians or Thuringians. Nevertheless some records during Merovingian times are clearly about Saxons living within what is now Northern Germany, north of the Franks.

- In about 531 the Franks, led by the eldest son of Clovis I, Theuderic I conquered the still independent kingdom of Thuringia, which henceforth became a kingdom under Frankish overlordship. Centuries later, medieval writers claimed that the early Saxons had assisted the Franks, and even that they had been brought from England for this purpose, but no contemporary sources mention this, and historians doubt that there was any conflict between the Saxons and the Thuringian kingdom.
- During the reign of Theuderic's son Theudebert I (534-548) Procopius described the region between the Rhine and Denmark being inhabited not by Saxons, but by a Warini kingdom. Their king Hermegisclus made a strategic alliance and married the sister of Theudebert named Theudechild, which brought them into conflict with their other allies, the Angles of Britain.
- In 555, after the death of Theudebert's son Theudebald, his grandfather Theuderic's younger half-brother Clothar I (also spelled Lothar) inherited rule over the Rhine regions. It is reported by Gregory of Tours (IV.10) and Marius of Avenches that Saxons "revolted", and the new ruler Clothar led an army in 556 to ravage Saxony and Thuringia. Thuringia, both authors mention, had supported the Saxons. In a possibly separate incident Gregory reports that Chlothar fought Saxons in 556 or 557 who had been stirred up by his own brother Childebert I to attack his territory, penetrating Frankish territory as far as Deutz, Cologne on the Rhine. (Springer argues against assuming that this was one incident, or involved one single group of Saxons, because Thuringia is quite far from Deutz.) Gregory of Tours (IV.14), drawing a moral lesson, reported that Chlothar was forced to fight by the Franks who did not want to negotiate, and that the Franks were subsequently beaten. However, later records indicate that a group of Saxons began paying tribute to the kings of Austrasia during Chlothar's reign.
- Sigebert I, the son of Clothar I who ruled Austrasia until 575, was praised by the poet Venantius Fortunatus for defeating the "Thuringian Saxons". (Springer suggests that like the term "Old Saxons" this was his way of distinguishing the mainland Saxons from the Anglo-Saxons of Britain.)
- According to the chronicle of Fredegar the Varni or Warni rebelled against the Merovingian Franks in 594 and were bloodily defeated by Childebert II in 595 (the year he died) "so that few of them survived".
- In 612, Sigebert's grandson Theuderic II attacked his own brother Theudebert II at Zülpich, with a force of Saxons, Thuringians, and other people from east of the Rhine.
- Heroic stories set in the 620s were written centuries later about Sigbert's nephew and eventual successor in Austrasia, Chlothar II and his defeat of Saxons led by Berthoald near the Weser. Dagobert I, Chlothar's son, was also involved.
- In 632, Dagobert I, now the most powerful king of the Franks, was met by Saxon messengers in Mainz in a period of war with the Wends under Samo, who were attacking Thuringia. These Saxons negotiated, or attempted to negotiate, the end of a tribute of 500 cows per year which they had been paying, in return for a promise to defend against the Wends at their own expense.

There were also Saxon populations in this period who were living in neither England, nor what would become Saxony.

- In 568/9, some Saxons were living in the Austrasian kingdom of Sigebert II, possibly in the Champagne region, and they accompanied the Lombards into Italy under the leadership of Alboin and settled there for some time. Sigebert in the meantime allowed a Suevian group to replace them in Austrasia. In 572, they returned to Gaul from Italy, raiding south-eastern Gaul as far as Estoublon, and were defeated twice by the Gallo-Roman general Mummolus, who robbed them of their plunder, and eventually let them continue. Upon arrival at their old home country they were furious about the Suevian settlers, and refused to negotiate with them. Gregory of Tours, our main source for these events, claims that there was divine intervention, allowing the much smaller Suebian group to utterly defeat the Saxons in two battles.
- One notable group of Saxons lived on the Normandy coast, near Bayeux. In 589, the Saxons from the Bessin region near Bayeux wore their hair in the Breton fashion at the orders of Fredegund, and fought with them as allies against Guntram. Beginning in 626, the Saxons of the Bessin were used by Dagobert I for his campaigns against the Basques. Much later, in 843 and 846 under king Charles the Bald, other official documents mention a pagus called Otlinga Saxonia in the Bessin region, but the meaning of Otlinga is unclear.
- In southwestern France, in the late 6th century Chulderic the Saxon became a duke north of the Garonne for Childeric II, after having previously been a subject of King Guntram. A century later, Aeghyna, a Duke of Gascony, died in 638. Both men are likely to have been Bayeux Saxons, although they may for example have come from Britain.
- Although unattested in historical sources, there seems to have been an early Saxon settlement in the vicinity of Boulogne-sur-Mer in the Pas-de-Calais which left a number of distinct place names ending in -thun.
- In 673, the army of King Wamba of the Visigoths is said to have driven out an invading army of Franks and Saxons from Septimania, then under Visigothic rule.

=== The Saxons and the Arnulfings ===
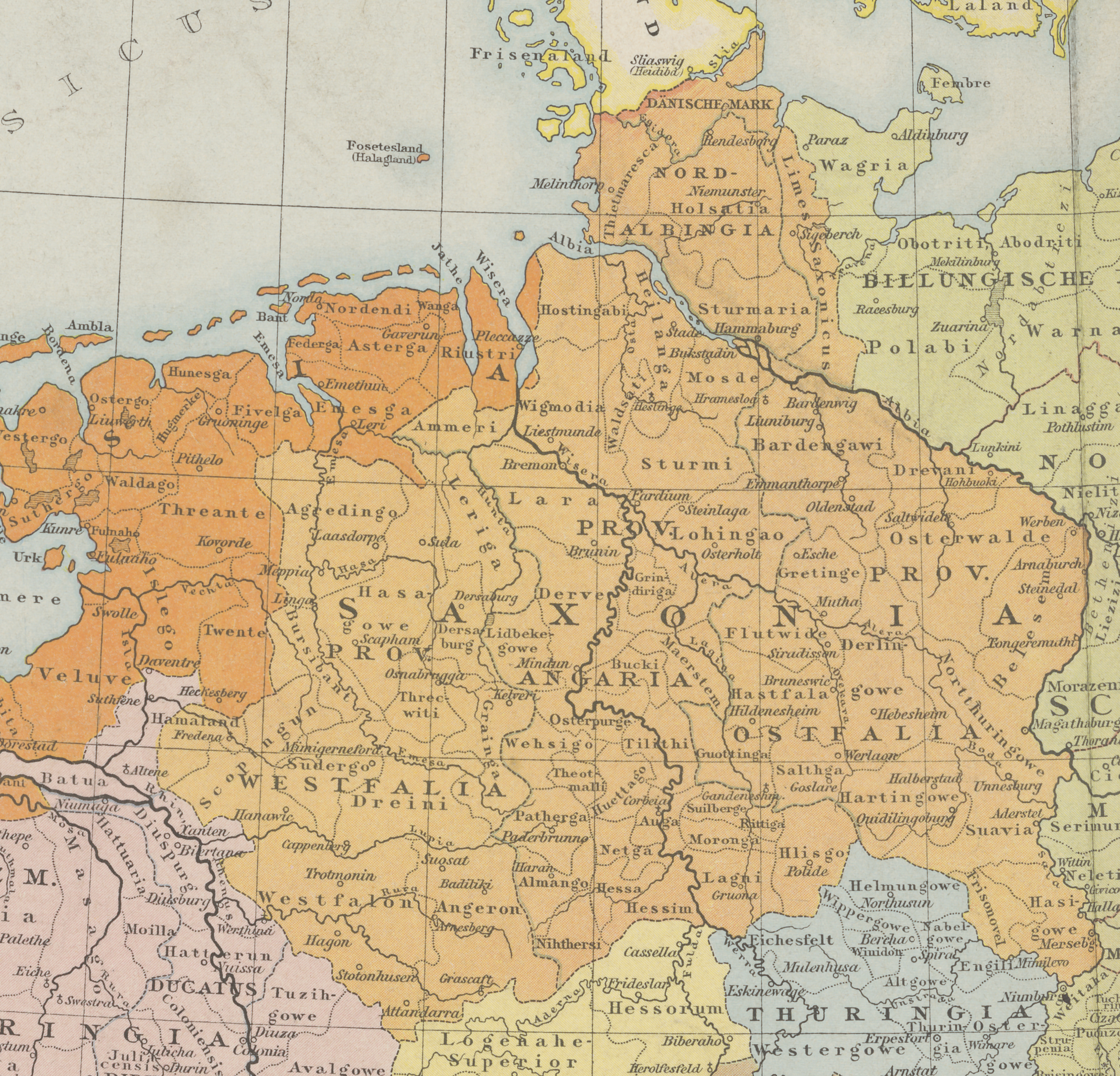
The later stem duchy of Saxony (c. 1000 AD), which was based in the Saxons' traditional homeland bounded by the rivers Ems, Eider and Elbe

The continental Saxons appear to have become consolidated by the end of the eighth century, partly as a result of interaction with the powerful Frankish kingdoms. The ancestors of Charlemagne, the Arnulfings, took control of the neighbouring Austrasian kingdom of the Franks, and sought to assert power over the peoples to the east, including not only the Bavarians, Swabians and Thuringians, which were long under Frankish rule, but also the Saxons and Frisians. They also pressured the Saxons and Frisians to convert to Christianity. In 804, the emperor Charlemagne conquered the Saxons, and incorporated the Saxons into the Frankish empire as a Stem Duchy, similar to the older ones, although there is no evidence that it had previously been a single kingdom. The Duchy of Saxony (804–1296) covered Westphalia, Eastphalia, Angria and Nordalbingia, which is roughly equivalent to Holstein, the southern part of modern-day Schleswig-Holstein state, now bordering on Denmark.

- In the 690s, Bede reported that a people known as the Boructuari were invaded by the pagan Saxons during a period when Saint Suibert, an Anglo-Saxon missionary bishop assigned to Frisia at that time, was doing missionary work in the area. This was probably near Frisia, and the area is widely believed to correspond to the Roman-era Bructeri, who were last reported living across the Rhine from Cologne in the 4th century.
- From the same report of Bede about English missionaries in the 690s the Two Ewalds were killed somewhere in Saxony while trying to convert one of the "satraps" of Saxony. The Ewalds apparently had the support of this local ruler, and also Pepin of Herstal who was the effective ruler of Frankish Austrasia at this time.
- In 715, not long after the death of Pepin of Herstal, Frankish annals report that Saxons took control of "Hattuaria". In later centuries this name was given to the Frankish country near Cleves and Xanten, between Rhine and Maas, but the area involved in this takeover may have been on opposite side of the Rhine. It is named after a Roman era Frankish tribe, the Chattuarii, who Ammianus Marcellinus reported to be living north of the Rhine in the 4th century.
- In 718, Charles Martel, the son of Pepin, invaded Saxony as far as the Weser. He campaigned there again in 720, 724, 738, and possibly also in 722 and 728.
- In the 730s, Bede wrote his Ecclesiastical History of the English People, which mentions, for example, that the land of the Angles was once between those of the Saxons and Jutes, but was now empty.
- Also in about this period the Ravenna Cosmography was written which uses the same term "Old Saxony" to refer to the apparent continental homeland of the British Saxons who the writer understood to have came from this Old Saxony with their leader named Ansehis. It describes the lands of the Saxons as lying on the Ocean coast between Frisia and the Danes. It also borders on Thuringia and contains the rivers "Lamizon", "Ipada", "Lippa" and "Limac" (generally interpreted as the Ems, Pader, Lippe and Leine). This work names its source as an earlier Gothic geographer named Marcomir, who had written an earlier study of Saxony.
- In 743, two of the sons of Charles, Pepin the Short and Carloman, marched against Odilo of Bavaria, who was nominally a Frankish subject. Carloman then turned north towards Saxony, or a part of it, which had sent troops to support Bavaria. After conquering the castrum of Ho(o)hseoburg forced the Saxon duke (war leader) Theoderic to surrender at a placitum held at that same place. The brothers invaded Saxony again the next year (744) and Theoderic was captured.
- In 748, Pepin the Short marched through Thuringia to Saxony, during a period when his half brother Grifo was attempting seize power in Bavaria. The part of Saxony beyond Thuringia where he went is referred to in the Annals of Metz as "North Swabia" and many of the Saxons there converted to Christianity at this time. The continuation of the Chronicle of Fredegar claims that they accepted to return to go back to paying a tribute of 500 cows.
- In 751, Pepin was crowned as king, and in 753, he attacked the Saxons northeast of the Rhine in the area of Bad Iburg and Bad Oeynhausen.
- In 758, Pepin attacked Saxony once more, and agreed to accept a tribute of 330 horses per year from the defeated Saxons.

=== Charlemagne's Saxon Wars ===
The Saxons were conquered by Charlemagne after a long series of annual campaigns, the Saxon Wars (772–804). With defeat came enforced baptism and conversion as well as the union of the Saxons with the rest of the Frankish empire. Their sacred tree or pillar, a symbol of Irminsul, was destroyed. Charlemagne deported 10,000 Nordalbingian Saxons to Neustria and gave their largely vacant lands in Wagria (approximately modern Plön and Ostholstein districts) to the loyal king of the Abotrites. Einhard, Charlemagne's biographer, says on the closing of this grand conflict:

The war that had lasted so many years was at length ended by their acceding to the terms offered by the king; which were renunciation of their national religious customs and the worship of devils, acceptance of the sacraments of the Christian faith and religion, and union with the Franks to form one people.

The Saxons long resisted becoming Christians and being incorporated into the orbit of the Frankish kingdom. In 776 the Saxons promised to convert to Christianity and vow loyalty to the king, but, during Charlemagne's campaign in Hispania (778), the Saxons advanced to Deutz on the Rhine and plundered along the river. This was an oft-repeated pattern when Charlemagne was distracted by other matters. A couple hundred years after the Charlemagne's conversion wars, Christianized Saxons joined the People's Crusade, with some possibly traveling through the Rhineland and an attested Saxon-Bohemian regiment dispersed by the Kingdom of Hungary around 1096.

=== The Duchy of Saxony ===
Under Carolingian rule, the Saxons were reduced to tributary status. There is evidence that the Saxons, as well as Slavic tributaries such as the Abodrites and the Wends, often provided troops to their Carolingian overlords. The dukes of Saxony became kings (Henry I, the Fowler, 919) and later the first emperors (Henry's son, Otto I, the Great) of Germany during the tenth century, but they lost this position in 1024. The duchy was divided in 1180 when Duke Henry the Lion refused to follow his cousin, Emperor Frederick Barbarossa, into war in Lombardy.

During the High Middle Ages, under the Salian emperors and, later, under the Teutonic Knights, German settlers moved east of the Saale into the area of a western Slavic tribe, the Sorbs. The Sorbs were gradually Germanised. This region subsequently acquired the name Saxony through political circumstances, though it was initially called the March of Meissen. The rulers of Meissen acquired control of the Duchy of Saxe-Wittenberg (only a remnant of the previous Duchy) in 1423; they eventually applied the name Saxony to the whole of their kingdom. Since then, this part of eastern Germany has been referred to as Saxony (German: Sachsen), a source of some misunderstanding about the original homeland of the Saxons, with a central part in the present-day German state of Lower Saxony (German: Niedersachsen).

== Language ==
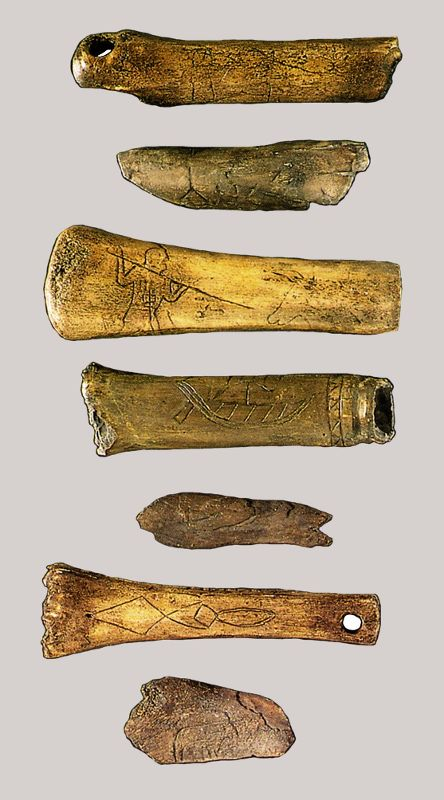
The Weser bones, 400–450 CE, were found on the lower Weser and are inscribed with images and Runes in a dialect probably ancestral to Old Saxon; individual bones show men attacking bulls and a Roman trading ship. The inscriptions may be curses.

With the exception of a few earlier Runic inscriptions, a distinct Old Saxon language is first attested in the 8th century CE, after the conquest of the Saxons by Charlemagne. Within the West Germanic languages, Old Saxon is typically considered one of the North Sea Germanic languages, and thus closely related to both Old English and Old Frisian, though it also shares many features with its continental neighbors, Old High German and Old Low Franconian. Our knowledge of the Old Saxon language comes primarily from the Heliand and fragmentary Old Saxon Genesis, two epics created as part of Frankish missionary work among the Saxons; other sources include several short prose texts, words found in Latin manuscripts as glosses, and Saxon personal and place names. Over the course of the Middle Ages, Old Saxon evolved first into Middle Low German (c. 1200-1500) and then into modern Low German (c. 1500).

== Culture ==
=== Social structure ===
Bede, a Northumbrian writing around the year 730, remarks that "the old (that is, the continental) Saxons have no king, but they are governed by several satraps who, during war, cast lots for leadership but who, in time of peace, are equal in power." The regnum Saxonum was divided into three provinces – Westphalia, Eastphalia and Angria – which comprised about one hundred pagi or Gaue. Each Gau had its own satrap with enough military power to level whole villages that opposed him.

In the mid-9th century, Nithard first described the social structure of the Saxons beneath their leaders. The caste structure was rigid; in the Saxon language the three castes, excluding slaves, were called the edhilingui (related to the term aetheling), frilingi and lazzi. These terms were subsequently Latinised as nobiles or nobiliores; ingenui, ingenuiles or liberi; and liberti, liti or serviles. According to very early traditions that are presumed to contain a good deal of historical truth, the edhilingui were the descendants of the Saxons who led the tribe out of Holstein and during the migrations of the sixth century. They were a conquering warrior elite. The frilingi represented the descendants of the amicii, auxiliarii and manumissi of that caste. The lazzi represented the descendants of the original inhabitants of the conquered territories, who were forced to make oaths of submission and pay tribute to the edhilingui.

The Lex Saxonum regulated the Saxons' different society. Intermarriage between the castes was forbidden by the Lex Saxonum, and wergilds were set based upon caste membership. The edhilingui were worth 1,440 solidi, or about 700 head of cattle, the highest wergild on the continent; the price of a bride was also very high. This was six times as much as that of the frilingi and eight times as much as the lazzi. The gulf between noble and ignoble was very large, but the difference between a freeman and an indentured labourer was small.

According to the Vita Lebuini antiqua, an important source for early Saxon history, the Saxons held an annual council at Marklo (Westphalia) where they "confirmed their laws, gave judgment on outstanding cases, and determined by common counsel whether they would go to war or be in peace that year." All three castes participated in the general council; twelve representatives from each caste were sent from each Gau. In 782, Charlemagne abolished the system of Gaue and replaced it with the Grafschaftsverfassung, the system of counties typical of Francia. By prohibiting the Marklo councils, Charlemagne pushed the frilingi and lazzi out of political power. The old Saxon system of Abgabengrundherrschaft, lordship based on dues and taxes, was replaced by a form of feudalism based on service and labour, personal relationships and oaths.

=== Religion ===
==== Paganism ====
Sources on Saxon paganism only exist from the time of their conversion to Christianity, and are all written by Christians. These sources likely provide a distorted view of Saxon religious practices. Charlemagne's Capitulatio de Partibus Saxoniae (between 755 and 790) includes prohibitions on several pagan practices. These included cremation burial, punishable by death, with the latest securely dated cremation burial in Saxony from around 800. Also prohibited were sacrifices to the gods, which were punishable by fine. The 9th-century Old Saxon Baptismal Vow, a text produced as part of the Christianization of the Saxons, requires swearers to renounce the worship of three deities: Thunaer, Wodan, and Saxnot. This last god is also attested in Anglo-Saxon royal genealogies; scholars believe him to be the mythical ancestor of the Saxons. Further information about Saxon paganism is provided by the surviving titles of the Indiculus superstitionum et paganiarum, a missionary text from the late 8th century cataloguing Saxon religious practices. It attests a cult of the dead, worship of "Mercury and Juppiter" (probably Thunaer and Wodan), worship in sacred groves, the use of idols, a belief in magic and witches, a practice of divination, and some syncretism with Christian beliefs.

The Life of Saint Lebuin (c. 900) records pagan practices held at an 8th-century Saxon political assembly at Marklo, during which prayers were offered to the gods and political and religious authority were mixed. Reports on the campaigns of Charlemagne also mention a kind of pillar or idol named Irminsul, located in Eresburg, which the Franks destroyed in 772. It may have functioned as a representation of a world tree and been the object of a pole cult.

==== Christianity ====
The continental Saxons were evangelised largely by English missionaries in the late seventh and early eighth centuries. Around 695, two early English missionaries, Hewald the White and Hewald the Black, were martyred by the vicani, that is, villagers. Throughout the century that followed, villagers and other peasants proved to be the greatest opponents of Christianisation, while missionaries often received the support of the edhilingui and other noblemen. Saint Lebuin, an Englishman who between 745 and 770 preached to the Saxons, mainly in the eastern Netherlands, built a church and made many friends among the nobility. Some of them rallied to save him from an angry mob at the annual council at Marklo (near river Weser, Bremen). Social tensions arose between the Christianity-sympathetic noblemen and the pagan lower castes, who were staunchly faithful to their traditional religion.

Under Charlemagne, the Saxon Wars had as their chief object the conversion and integration of the Saxons into the Frankish empire. Though much of the highest caste converted readily, forced baptisms and forced tithing made enemies of the lower orders. Even some contemporaries found the methods employed to win over the Saxons wanting, as this excerpt from a letter of Alcuin of York to his friend Meginfrid, written in 796, shows:

If the light yoke and sweet burden of Christ were to be preached to the most obstinate people of the Saxons with as much determination as the payment of tithes has been exacted, or as the force of the legal decree has been applied for fault of the most trifling sort imaginable, perhaps they would not be averse to their baptismal vows.

Charlemagne's successor, Louis the Pious, reportedly treated the Saxons more as Alcuin would have wished, and as a consequence they were faithful subjects. The lower classes, however, revolted against Frankish overlordship in favour of their old paganism as late as the 840s, when the Stellinga rose up against the Saxon leadership, who were allied with the Frankish emperor Lothair I. After the suppression of the Stellinga, in 851 Louis the German brought relics from Rome to Saxony to foster a devotion to the Roman Catholic Church. The Poeta Saxo, in his verse Annales of Charlemagne's reign (written between 888 and 891), laid an emphasis on his conquest of Saxony. He celebrated the Frankish monarch as on par with the Roman emperors and as the bringer of Christian salvation to people.

===== Christian literature =====
In the ninth century, the Saxon nobility became vigorous supporters of monasticism and formed a bulwark of Christianity against the existing Slavic paganism to the east and the Nordic paganism of the Vikings to the north. Much Christian literature was produced in the vernacular Old Saxon, the notable ones being a result of the literary output and wide influence of Saxon monasteries such as Fulda, Corvey and Verden; and the theological controversy between the Augustinian, Gottschalk and Rabanus Maurus.

From an early date, Charlemagne and Louis the Pious supported Christian vernacular works in order to evangelise the Saxons more efficiently. The Heliand, a verse epic of the life of Christ in a Germanic setting, and Genesis, another epic retelling of the events of the first book of the Bible, were commissioned in the early ninth century by Louis to disseminate scriptural knowledge to the masses. A council of Tours in 813 and then a synod of Mainz in 848 both declared that homilies ought to be preached in the vernacular. The earliest preserved text in the Saxon language is a baptismal vow from the late eighth or early ninth century; the vernacular was used extensively in an effort to Christianise the lowest castes of Saxon society.

== Saxon as a demonym ==
=== Celtic languages ===
In the hypothetical insular Celtic languages grouping, the words designating English nationality may derive from the Latin word Saxones.

Sassenach (older spellings: Sassanich or Sassenagh) is a loanword in English from the Scottish Gaelic term Sasunnach, originally used by Gaels for both the English and the Scots language speaking lowlanders of Scotland. In the 20th century, Scots–English tended to use it as a disparaging or jocular term for an English person.

Sasanach, the Irish word for an Englishman (with Sasana meaning England), has the same derivation, as do the words used in Welsh to describe the English people (Saeson, singular Sais) and the language and things English in general: Saesneg and Seisnig.

Cornish terms the English Sawsnek, from the same derivation. In the 16th century Cornish-speakers used the phrase Meea navidna cowza sawzneck to feign ignorance of the English language. The Cornish words for the English people and England are Sowsnek and Pow Sows ('Land [Pays] of Saxons'). Similarly Breton, spoken in north-western France, has saoz(on) ('English'), saozneg ('the English language'), and Bro-saoz for 'England'.

=== Romance languages ===
The label Saxons (in Romanian: Sași) also became attached to German settlers who settled during the 12th century in southeastern Transylvania. From Transylvania, some of these Saxons migrated to neighbouring Moldavia, as the name of the town Sascut, in present-day Romania, shows.

=== Non-Indo-European languages ===
The Finns and Estonians have changed their usage of the root Saxon over the centuries to apply now to the whole country of Germany (Saksa and Saksamaa respectively) and the Germans (saksalaiset and sakslased, respectively). The Finnish word sakset (scissors) reflects the name of the old Saxon single-edged sword – seax – from which the name Saxon supposedly derives. In Estonian, saks means colloquially, 'a wealthy person'. As a result of the Northern Crusades, Estonia's upper class comprised mostly Baltic Germans, persons of supposedly Saxon origin until well into the 20th century.

== Saxony as a later toponym ==
Following the downfall of Henry the Lion (1129–1195, Duke of Saxony 1142–1180), and the subsequent splitting of the Saxon tribal duchy into several territories, the name of the Saxon duchy was transferred to the lands of the Ascanian family. This led to the differentiation between Lower Saxony (lands settled by the Saxon tribe) and Upper Saxony (the lands belonging to the House of Wettin). Gradually, the latter region became known as Saxony, ultimately usurping the name's original geographical meaning. The area formerly known as Upper Saxony now lies in Central Germany – in the eastern part of the present-day Federal Republic of Germany: note the names of the federal states of Saxony and Saxony-Anhalt.
