= Aeghyna =

Aighyna, Aeghyna, Aegyna, Aigino, or Aichina, probably a Saxon, was the duke of Gascony (Vasconia) from 626 or 627 to his death in 638. He succeeded Genial. The chief source for his reign is Fredegar.

He probably hailed from the Bessin, which contained many Saxon colonies at the time. He was mentioned as a Saxon dux in 626. He repressed the intrigues of the bishops Palladius and Sidocus of Eauze, exiling them for inciting Basque revolts, and even ordered the assassination of one of Charibert II's councillors in the palace at Clichy.

In 635, he took part in the great Frankish expedition against the Basques, which involved ten Burgundian duces and ten columns. Aeghyna was reinstated after this. He was certainly the duke of the Basques (Vascones) in 636, when he is recorded as conducting the Basque chiefs (seniores) who submitted to Dagobert I at Clichy. Though he is certainly not of Basque stock, whether he acted as a tribal leader with only tenuous ties to the Frankish monarchy or as the Frankish client duke of a vassal people is unknown.

== Sources ==
- Collins, Roger. The Basques. Blackwell Publishing: London, 1990.
- Wallace-Hadrill, J. M., translator. The Fourth Book of the Chronicle of Fredegar with its Continuations. Greenwood Press: Connecticut, 1960.
- Lewis, Archibald R. "The Dukes in the Regnum Francorum, A.D. 550-751." Speculum, Vol. 51, No. 3. (Jul., 1976), pp. 381–410.
- Auñamendi Encyclopedia: Ducado de Vasconia.
- Monlezun, Jean Justin. Histoire de la Gascogne. 1846.
- Higounet, Charles. Bordeaux pendant le haut moyen age. Bordeaux, 1963.
