= Two Hewalds =

Christian missionaries in 690s Germany

Saints Ewald the Black Ewald the Fair
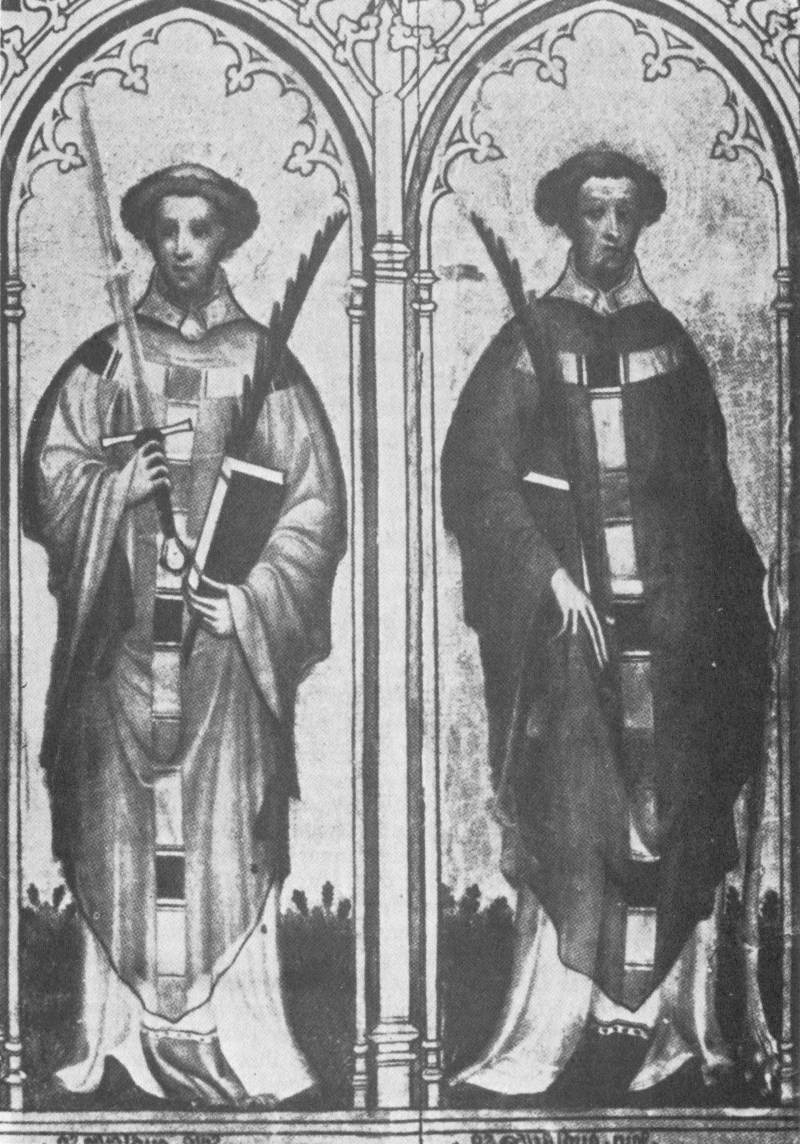
- Painting of the pair on the Ewaldi-Reliquienschrein at the Church of Saint Kunibert, Cologne, c. 1400

Martyrs
- Died: c.692
- Venerated in: Catholic Church; Eastern Orthodox Church
- Feast: October 3
- Patronage: Westphalia

The 'Two Hewalds' (rarely "Ewalds") were Saint Hewald the Black and Saint Hewald the White, Anglo-Saxon martyrs in Old Saxony about 692. Both bore the same name, but were distinguished by the difference in the colour of their hair and complexions. They began their mission labours about 690 at the ancient Saxons country, now part of Westphalia, and covered by the dioceses of Münster, Osnabrück, and Paderborn. They are honored as saints in Westphalia.

== Background ==
The two priests were companions, both natives of Northumbria, England. According to the example of many at that time, they spent several years as students in the schools of Ireland. Hewald the Black was the more learned of the two, but both were equally renowned for holiness of life. They were apparently acquainted with St. Willibrord, the Apostle of Friesland, and were animated with his zeal for the conversion of the Germans. Some sources number them among the eleven companions of that saint. More probably, however, they set out from England after St. Willibrord's departure, in an attempt to convert their own cousins in Old Saxony.

They entered upon their mission about 690. The scene of their labours was the country of the ancient Saxons, now part of Westphalia, and covered by the dioceses of Münster, Osnabrück, and Paderborn. At first the Hewalds took up their abode in the house of the steward of a certain Saxon earl or ealdorman (satrapa). Bede remarks that "the old Saxons have no king, but they are governed by several ealdormen [satrapas] who during war cast lots for leadership, but who in time of peace are equal in power" (Historia ecclesiastica gentis Anglorum, V, 10). The steward entertained his two guests for several days, and promised to conduct them to the chieftain. They intended to convert him and so affirmed they had a message of considerable importance to deliver to him.

The pagan Saxons, witnessing these activities of the Christian priests and missionaries, began to suspect that the Hewalds planned to convert their over-lord, destroy their temples and supplant their religion. Inflamed with jealousy and anger, they resolved that the Hewalds should die. An uprising followed and both priests were quickly seized. Hewald the White was killed quickly by sword; Hewald the Black was tortured and torn limb from limb, after which both their bodies were cast into the Rhine. This is understood to have happened on 3 October at a place called Aplerbeck, today a district of Dortmund, where a chapel still stands. When the ealdorman heard of what had been done, he became angry and fearful of reprisals, and punished the murderers by putting them to death and burning their villages.

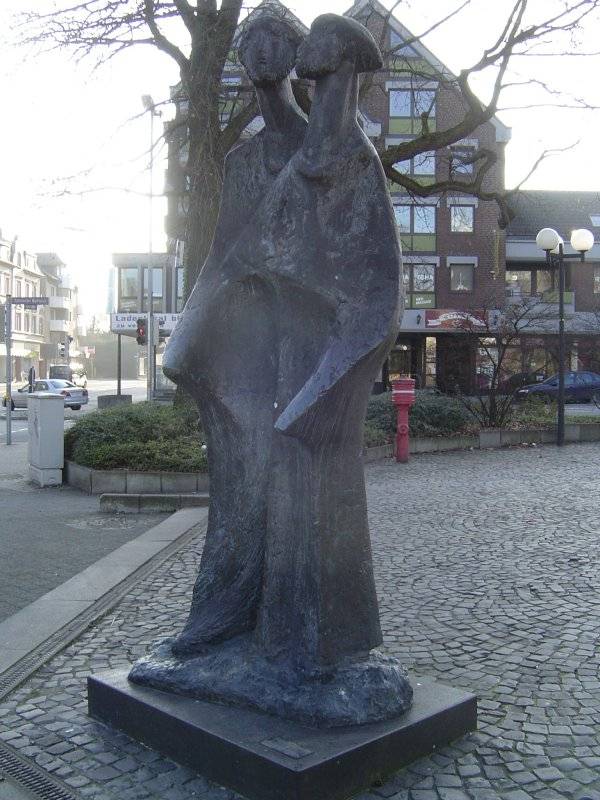
Monument of the Ewalds standing in Dortmund-Aplerbeck, Germany

Christian sources describe various miracles after the priests' deaths, including their martyred bodies being miraculously carried against the stream for the space of forty miles to the place in which the companions of the Hewalds were residing. As they floated along, says the Catholic Encyclopedia, "a heavenly light, like a column of fire, was seen to shine above them." Even the murderers are said to have witnessed the miraculous brightness. Moreover, one of the martyrs appeared in vision to the monk Tilmon (a companion of the Ewalds), and told him where the bodies would be found: "that the spot would be there where he should see a pillar of light reaching from earth to heaven". Tilmon arose and found the bodies, and interred them with the honours due to martyrs. From that time onwards, the memory of the Hewalds was annually celebrated in those parts. A spring of water is said to have gushed forth in the place of the martyrdom.

Pepin, Duke of Austrasia, having heard of the wonders that had occurred, caused the bodies to be buried in Cologne, where they were solemnly enshrined in the collegiate church of St. Kunibert. The heads of the martyrs were bestowed on Frederick, Bishop of Münster, by Archbishop Anno of Cologne, at the opening of the shrine in 1074. These relics were probably destroyed by the Anabaptists in 1534. When Saint Norbert visited Cologne, in 1121, he obtained two small vessels containing the relics of several saints, and among them were bones of the sainted Ewalds. These were deposited either at Prémontré or at Floreffe, a Premonstratensian monastery in the province of Namur. The two Ewalds are honoured as patrons in Westphalia, and are mentioned in the Roman Martyrology on 3 October. Their feast is celebrated in the dioceses of Cologne and Münster. The Saxons were eventually converted to Christianity by force in the 8th century by Charlemagne.

Until the martyrdom of Saint Boniface in 754, the Ewalds were the last missionaries to be martyred in this area. Franz Staab, a medievalist, attributes their deaths to a lack of support from the secular government.

Druten, in the east of the Netherlands, has a church dedicated to the Hewalds, with statues for the two made in the studio Atelier Cuypers-Stoltzenberg, owned by Pierre Cuypers and F. Stoltzenberg.

== See also ==
- Ewald Saints, patron saint archive
