= Genial =

7th-century nobleman

Genial (Latin Genialis or Genealis) was the Duke of Gascony (Vasconia) in the early seventh century. He is mentioned in the Chronicle of Fredegar.

Genial was probably a Frank or a Gallo-Roman when Theuderic II and Theudebert II appointed him dux over the Basques (Vascones) of southwestern Aquitaine:

Theudebert and Theuderic sent an army against the Wascones and with God's help defeated them, subjected them to their overlordship, and made them pay tribute. They appointed a duke named Genialis, who ruled them well.

Some scholars believe Genial was more of a tribal leader over whom the Frankish sovereigns exercised a vague suzerainty than a Frankish court official sent to the outskirts of the realm to lord it over a subject people. Sometime around 612, Sisebut, king of the Visigoths, reconquered the trans-Pyrenean portion of his realm, diminishing Frankish suzerainty in Vasconia. Genial was succeeded by Aeghyna.

== Sources ==
- Collins, Roger. The Basques. Blackwell Publishing: London, 1990.
- Wallace-Hadrill, J. M., translator. The Fourth Book of the Chronicle of Fredegar with its Continuations. Greenwood Press: Connecticut, 1960.
- Lewis, Archibald R. "The Dukes in the Regnum Francorum, A.D. 550-751." Speculum, Vol. 51, No. 3. (Jul., 1976), pp. 381–410.
- Auñamendi Encyclopedia: Ducado de Vasconia.
- Monlezun, Jean Justin. Histoire de la Gascogne. 1846.
- Higounet, Charles. Bordeaux pendant le haut moyen age. Bordeaux, 1963.
