= Hamza al-Zighayir =

Hamza al-Zighayir حمزة الزغير
- Born: 1921; Karbala, Iraq
- Died: October 16, 1976 (aged 54–55) Karbala, Iraq
- Occupation: Eulogy reciter
- Years active: 1940–1976

Hamza Abboud Ismail al-Sa'di (Arabic: حمزة عبود اسماعيل السعدي; 1921– October 16, 1976), famously known as Hamza al-Zighayir, was an Iraqi Shi'ite eulogy reciter.

== Early life ==
Al-Zighayir was born in Bab al-Taag, Karbala. His father, Abboud died when he was young, and al-Zighayir was raised by his widowed mother. He learnt the Quran at a young age. He was taken in by a Sheikh Abbas al-Saffar, who pushed him towards reading and eventually reciting elegies for the Ahl al-Bayt. He gained the epithet al-zighayir (the small/junior) to distinguish him from two other Hamza's, Hamza al-Samach (the fishmonger), and Hamza al-Tawil (the tall).

== Business career ==
Al-Zighayir came from a very humble background, and first started working selling aluminum cookware. However, after a while, he purchased a small kiosk and sold dairy products from it. Eventually, he opened an ironing shop, and ironed clothes until his death.

== Reciting career ==
al-Zighayir began reciting in his third decade, and gained recognition quickly for his unique voice and melodies. He rose to fame in a short period of time, and began being invited to recite at the Imam Husayn shrine, and many other processions across the city. He then began representing Karbala in their processions when they used to visit the shrines in other cities, such as the Imam Ali shrine, Kadhimayn shrines, and Askariayn shrines.

He recited mainly the late poet, Sheikh Kadhim Mandhoor, but also other poets such as Aziz Gilgawi, Mehdi al-Amawi, Sa'eed al-Hirr, Abood Ghafla, Abd al-Husayn al-Shari', and many others.

== Personal life ==
al-Zighayir was married, and had three daughters, and one son. He had five sons whom all died a few months after their birth, except for his only surviving son, Ahmed (born 1956).

al-Zighayir is considered to be the main inspiration behind the renowned elegy reciter, Basim al-Karbalaei.

== Death ==
Al-Zighayir developed nasal vestibulitis due to his habit of plucking hair from his nose. He began receiving treatment in Baghdad, which would last for two weeks, however, he abandoned the treatment on the ninth day. When he went back to treat it, he found out that he had developed cancer, and his doctor informed him that he did not have long left.

On Saturday, October 16, 1976, al-Zighayir passed away. His family had to bury him at night, due to fears from the Baathist regime, and he was laid in the old cemetery.

== See also ==
- Mourning in Muharram
- Basim al-Karbalaei
