= Lebuinus =

8th-century Christian saint

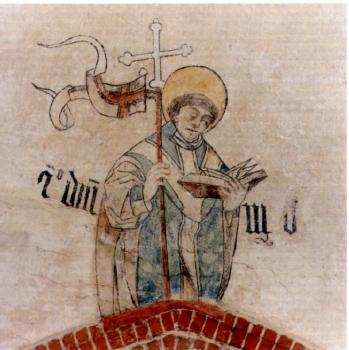
- Fresco of Saint Lebuinus

Apostle of the Frisians
- Died: 775
- Venerated in: Roman Catholic Church; Eastern Orthodox Church; Anglican Communion
- Feast: 12 November

Lebuinus (also known as Lebuin, Lebwin or Liafwin[e]; died c. 775) was a medieval Christian monk who is the Apostle of the Frisians and patron saint of the city of Deventer in the Netherlands. He was born in England to Anglo-Saxon parents, date unknown, and died at Deventer about 775.

== Life ==
Lebuinus was a monk in Wilfrid's monastery at Ripon. Inspired by the examples of Boniface, Willibrord, and other great English missionaries, he resolved to devote his life to the conversion of the Germans. After his ordination, he proceeded in 754 to Utrecht, and was welcomed by Gregory, acting bishop of that place, who entrusted him with the mission of Overijssel on the borders of Westphalia, and gave him a companion - Marchelm (or Marcellinus), a disciple of Willibrord.

Lebuinus preached the Gospel among the tribes of the district, and erected a little chapel at Wilp (see: Voorst) (Wilpa) on the west bank of the IJssel. His venerable personality and deep learning quickly won many to Christianity, even among the nobles, and it soon became necessary to build at Deventer on the east bank of the river a larger church. However, Lebuinus's great success aroused hostility among the pagans. Ascribing his conversions to witchcraft, they formed an alliance with the anti-Christian Saxons, burned the church at Deventer and dispersed the converts.

After escaping with difficulty, Lebuinus determined to voice the claims of Christianity at the national assembly (Allthing) of the Saxons at Marklo near the Weser (Northwestern Germany).

The Vitae of Lebuinus describes in great details, his appearance before the assembly, where, it is claimed, he pointed out to the Saxons the inefficacy of their deities. It also describes how he warned them of impending destruction at the hands of a powerful king unless they converted to Christianity. With the intercession of the nobleman Buto, he persuaded them sufficiently of the power of his mission that they not only allowed him to escape with his life, but allowed him to preach unmolested in the territory allotted him. His life may have been a source of inspiration in the creation of the cultus of Livinus of Ghent.

== Death ==
On his return to Friesland, Lebuinus rebuilt the church at Deventer where he was later buried. The exact date of his death is unknown, however it is almost certain that it occurred before 776, because during that year, the Saxons attacked and burnt the church at Deventer and yet could not identify his remains inside of the church after three days. His body and a copy of the Gospels presumed to have been written by his hand were still in Deventer, in a church bearing his name, until 882 when it was again destroyed by the Normans. The relics of St. Livinus (whose feast also is on 12 November) are probably those of Lebuinus. Saint Ludger rebuilt the church a few years later, and in doing so rediscovered the saint's remains beneath the site.

== Veneration ==
- Lebuinus is commemorated by the Church on 12 November, mostly in the Netherlands.
- The Lebuïnuskerk, Deventer was consecrated in his name.

== Primary sources ==
- Lives of St Lebuinus:
  - Vita (Lebuini) antiqua, earliest Life (9th or early 10th century)
    - ed. A. Hofmeister. Vita Lebuini antiqua. MGH Scriptores 30.2. pp. 789–95.
    - tr. C.H. Talbot (1954). Anglo-Saxon Missionaries in Germany.
  - Hucbald of Saint-Amand, Vita Lebuini (between 918 and 930).
    - ed. Laurentius Surius. Vitæ Sanctorum. Vol. 6. pp. 277–86.; ed. Patrologia Latina 132, pp. 877–94; MGH Scriptores 2, pp. 360–4, in abbreviated form.
    - tr. Serenus Cressy. Church History of Brittany 24.7.
  - 15th-century Life
    - ed. M. Coens, 'Vie de S. Lebuin', in: Analecta bollandiana, 34/35 (1915-1916) 319–330.
- Radbod, Ecloga et Sermo (on Lebuinus), in Surius, VI, 839
- Altfrid, Vita Liutgeri in MGH Scriptores, II, 360 sqq.
