= Livinus =

Irish saint, apostle of Flanders and Brabant

Saint Livinus
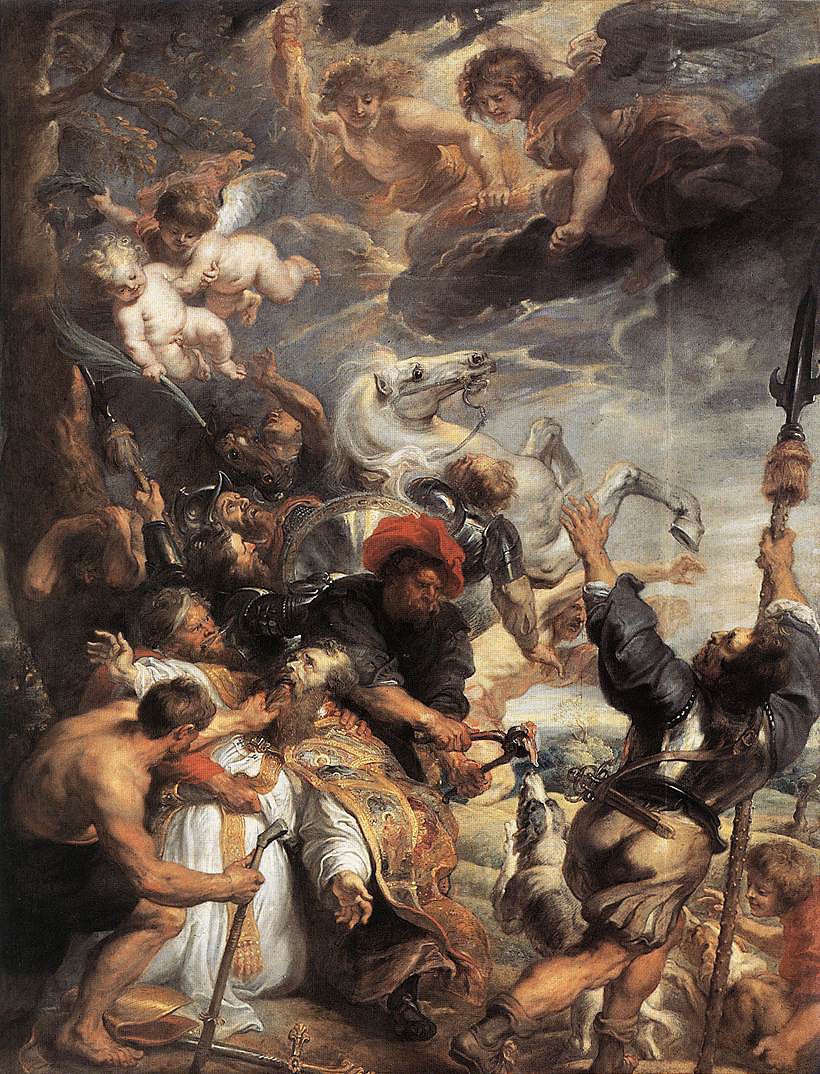
- The Martyrdom of St Livinus - Rubens, 1633
- Born: c. 580; Ireland
- Died: 12 November 657; Sint-Lievens-Houtem, Flanders
- Venerated in: Eastern Orthodox Church; Roman Catholic Church
- Feast: 12 November

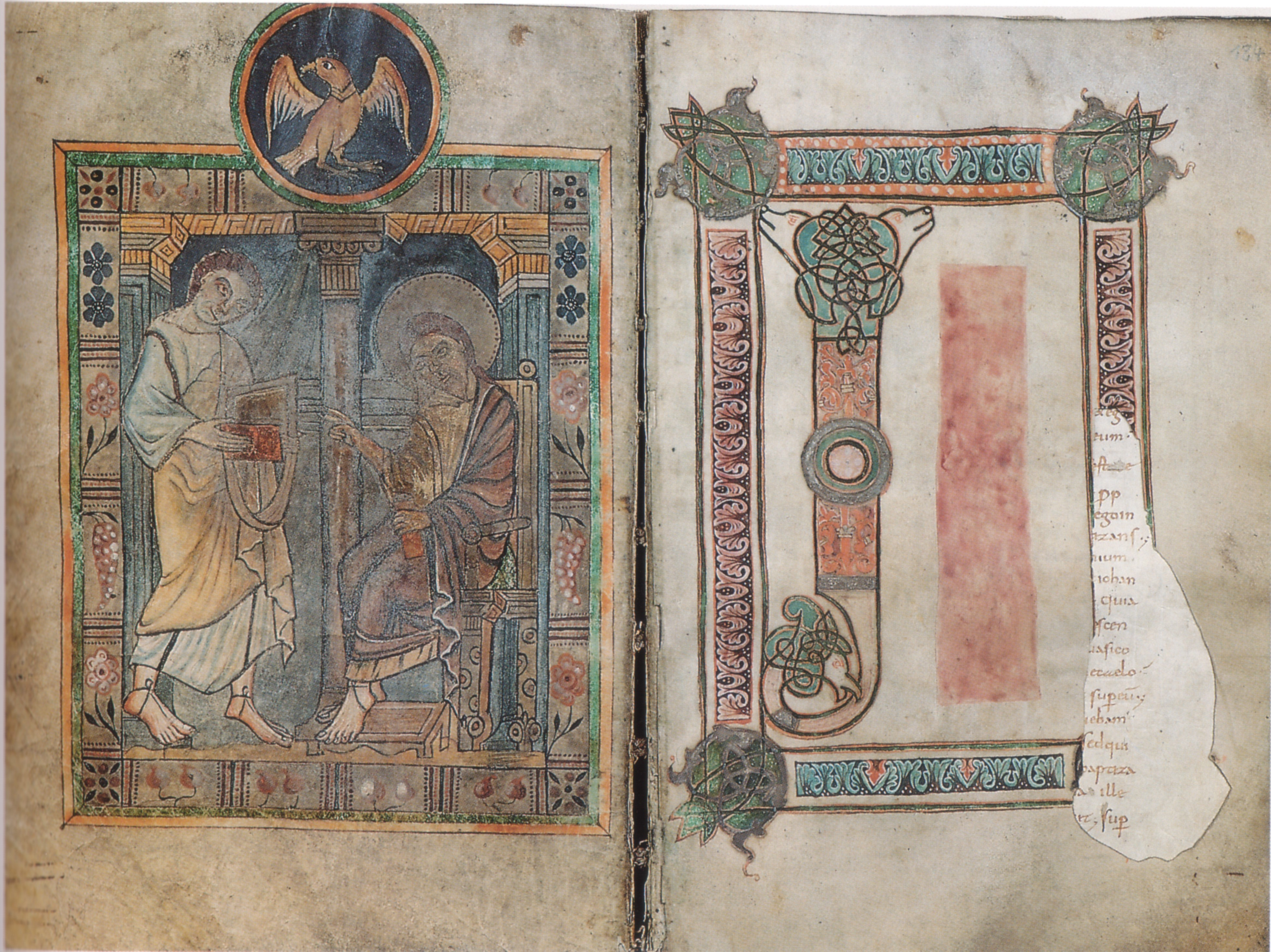
The so-called Livinus Gospels, Ghent (9th century)

Saint Livinus (c. 580 – 12 November 657), also Livinus of Ghent, was an apostle in Flanders and Brabant, venerated as a saint and martyr in the Catholic tradition and more especially at the Saint Bavo Chapel, Ghent. His feast day is 12 November.

== Legend and hagiography ==
Details of the biography of Deventer saint Lebuinus were used to compile the Passio of St Livinus.

The legend goes that Livinus was born from Irish nobility. Upon studies in England, where he visited Saint Augustine of Canterbury, he returned to Ireland. He was bishop of Dublin in 656. He later went on a peregrinatio Domini and left Ireland for Ghent (Belgium) and Zeeland (Netherlands) where he preached. During one of his sermons, Livinus was attacked in the village of Esse, near Geraardsbergen by a group of pagans who cut off his tongue and head.

The villages of Sint-Lievens-Esse, where he was murdered, and Sint-Lievens-Houtem, where he was buried, were named after him, as well as Merck-Saint-Liévin in northern France.

His remains were transferred to Ghent around the turn of the millennium, but went missing and are believed to have been destroyed in 1578 during the Second Iconoclasm.

== Myth or reality? ==
Recent research questions the existence of Saint Livinus. There are resemblances between Saint Livinus and Saint Lebuinus of Deventer (Netherlands), an English missionary who died in Deventer c. 775 and who is commemorated on 12 November in the Utrecht diocese. Both figures were engaged in the christening of pagans in the Low Countries and were confronted with similar conflicts and clashes. It has been argued that monks of the Saint Bavo Abbey in Ghent, Livinus' presumed place of residence, have launched the cultus of Saint Livinus and found inspiration in the life of Saint Lebuinus.

A hagiography of the saint (edited in Migne, Patrologia Latina, 89) was formerly ascribed to Saint Boniface.
