= Marklo =

Capital of Old Saxony

Marklo was, according to the Vita Lebuini antiqua (an important source for early Saxon history), the tribal capital of the Saxons in which they held an annual council to "confirm laws, give judgment on outstanding cases, and determine by common counsel whether they would go to war or be in peace that year." After the conquest of old Saxony by Charlemagne in 782 the tribal councils of Marklo were abolished.

Marklo was identified by the 19th-century anthropologist Henry Hoyle Howorth with the village of Markenah in the County of Hoya near Heiligen Ioh, a "sacred wood" and Adelshorn in Lower Saxony.
