= Basim al-Karbalaei =

Iraqi eulogy reciter (born 1966)

Basim al-Karbalaei باسم إسماعيل الكربلائي
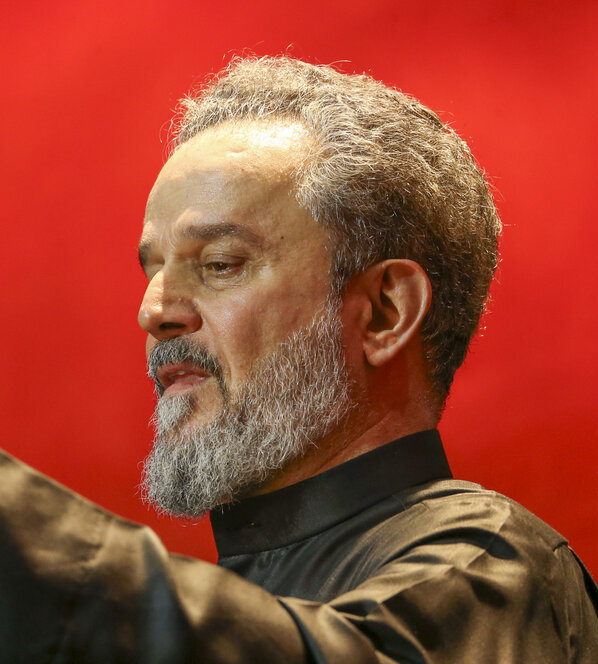

Background information
- Born: Basim Ismail Maitham Muhammad-Ali; 11 November 1966 (age 60); Karbala, Iraqi Republic
- Occupation: Eulogy reciter
- Years active: 1981–present
- Labels: BK Media; al-Thaqalayn Records; al-Hayat Media; Fadak Records; Karbala Records; Anwar al-Huda; al-Raya al-Imamiya; ِAniss al-Nofoss
- Website: http://bk-media.net/

Haj Basim Ismail Muhammad-Ali al-Karbalaei (Arabic: باسم إسماعيل محمد علي الكربلائي; born 11 November 1966), commonly known as Basim Karbalaei is an Iraqi Shi'ite eulogy reciter.

Al-Karbalaei's voice and performance is considered particularly distinctive, the former is considered one of the most compelling instruments in the history of lamentations for the Ahl al-Bayt. His vocal abilities have allowed him to be identified as one of the greatest voices in the Arab world, widely heard by audiences all across the globe.

His choice of poetry, melodies, performances, were able to attract millions of listeners, allowing them to abandon the types of music that are religiously forbidden. Al-Karbalaei managed to fill a void for them, by continuously introducing new methods and styles in his recitations. He has also produced works in languages other than Arabic, like Persian, Urdu and English. Al-Karbalaei, for the most of it, has been apolitical with his elegies, trying to keep his elegies exclusively about the Ahl al-Bayt and their memory.

In 2019, al-Karbalaei was gifted with a crown made of pure gold, and dubbed Sultan al-Minbar al-Hussaini (sultan of the Husayni pulpit), by the Hussaini Reciters Association in Kadhimiya. He later donated the crown to the Abbas shrine museum.

== Early life ==
Al-Karbalaei was born in Karbala, to Ismail al-Karbalaei, and Siddiqa al-Tukmachi. He is the fourth of seven children. Whilst in Karbala, he was inspired by senior eulogy reciter Hamza al-Zighayir, and participated in his majalis (plu. mourning gatherings), until he died in 1976.

In 1980, al-Karbalaei and his family emigrated to Iran, fleeing Bathist persecution. He lived in Isfahan, near his mother's family, and it was his uncle Rasool al-Tukmachi, who discovered al-Karbalaei's talent and began to encourage him to recite praises and lamentations in memory of the Ahl al-Bayt. He was then taken under the wing of a Mulla Taqi, who began taking him to the Husayniya; established by the people of Karbala who resided in Isfahan, to participate in. The first ever eulogy he recited was Taj al-Sa'ada Lel Yiwali Haidar (Arabic: تاج السعادة لليوالي حيدر), by renowned late poet, Kadhim Manthoor.

Al-Karbalaei, then began to recite in different cities across Iran, at Husayniyya established by the Iraqi community. In Isfahan, he learns the Quran and its sounds well for five years. Then he goes to a person named Mullah Taghi Karbalaei to ask him for help. Bassem learns some poems from Mullah Taghi Karbalaei. His name quickly spread between the congregations, and began to attract the youth to his majalis, and through listening to him, they would cultivate pious sensibilities.

Al-Karbalaei began reciting eulogies mainly written by Muhammad-Ridha Fatthallah. However, after the death of Fatthallah, he was introduced to Jaber al-Kadhimi. al-Karbalaei and al-Kadhimi got on very well, and whilst the former was considered to be a talented reciter, the latter was considered one of the best poets of that time. It was here that a long relationship began, where they would produce modern melodies and lyrics, straying away from the traditional tunes and poetry that were recited before them.

The first ten nights of Muharram (that are spent retelling the story of the murder of Hussain, his family and his companions on Ashura) are considered second only to Ramadan in its significance, and its considered the largest in congregation compared to other mourning seasons, and every Shia eulogy reciter dreams of hosting these ten nights, and al-Karbalaei's first ten night function was in 1988, in Qom. That year witnessed the beginning of al-Karbalaei's recognition as a capable reciter.

In 2020 due to the COVID-19 pandemic, he was infected with the virus and he could not read for the first ten nights of Muharram because of the pandemic, but in Muharram 2021, he started reading again after he recovered and the COVID-19 crisis receded.

== Career ==
In 1994, al-Karbalaei was invited to recite for the first ten nights of Muharram in Kuwait. His majalis were recorded onto tape cassettes and distributed across the Islamic world. This allowed exposure on a much larger scale, and gained him international recognition. He also began to receive invitations in other countries, as close as Lebanon and as far as Australia. He took residence in Kuwait, moving with his family.

Following the advice of his mentor, Muhammad Ridha al-Shirazi, he formed a group of aspiring reciters, called Shabab al-Thaqalayn, which was an ensemble of eighty youth, similar to a choir. This group often participated in auspicious functions celebrating the births of the Ahl al-Bayt. The group produced a notable amount of senior reciters.

Upon many invitations, al-Karbalaei's visited Bahrain for the first time in 2002, for the first ten nights of Muharram. This was also the first time al-Karbalaei he was going to leave Kuwait in Muharram, after performing there for eight consecutive years. This proved a new challenge for al-Karbalaei, since the people of Bahrain had a slightly different approach when it came to the culture of latom (chest beating). He managed to quickly cope and accommodate to their metre, earning the recognition as a true innovator in the eulogy reciter's world.

After the invasion of Iraq in 2003, al-Karbalaei visited Iraq, after being separated from his homeland for just over twenty-three years. He was welcomed greatly by his fellow countrymen. Majalis were hosted for him, in each of the holy sites, with crowds reaching up to hundreds of thousands. However, al-Karbalaei did not remain in Iraq for too long and returned to Kuwait, whilst still focusing on his performances across the globe. He spent the next couple of years of between Manama and London for Muharram, and other Arab and Western countries for the other seasons. Eventually in 2007, he left Kuwait altogether, to settle in his wife's hometown, in Oman.

== Media ==
al-Karbalaei is the first Shia eulogy reciter to produce a qasida (elegy) in a studio. His first production was a feature in a project with Dawood Hussein, called al-mubahila. After that, he went to produce over sixty albums, consisting of seven to ten tracks each. He was also the first reciter to release a video recording of a qasida. In the late 1990s and early 2000s, he saw a huge success in album sales in Kuwait, Bahrain, Saudi and Lebanon. In 2003, after the Iraq invasion, when religious repression was lifted from the Shias, religious songs became a sought for commodity. Music stores across the country would declare that in ordinary days, people would buy ten Basim CD's to one Kadhim al-Sahir CD, as for during religious seasons, sales of Basim CDs would significantly increase. Gradually, al-Karbalaei's media presence and following became huge, his YouTube channel began to show for this, with more than eight million subscribers and over two billion video views.

al-Karbalaei has appeared on numerous state television channels, such as Bahrain, Lebanon and Iraq, and his sound tracks are constantly aired. He frequently appears on satellite channels.

== Works ==
Al-Karbalaei has authored three volumes of his book Hatha Ma Qara't (This Is What I Have Recited), which is a compilation of the elegies he has recited across his career.

== Personal life ==
Al-Karbalaei is married to an Omani woman. He has four children, a son (Ali) and three daughters (Fatimeh, Rayhoneh and Roghayeh). His daughter Fatima, participated in his album Sawad al-Layl, in 2007, while his son Ali and daughter Roghayeh, began participating in albums with their father in 2013 until 2017.

== Muharram Participations ==
Muharram Participation's
Gregorian Year	Lunar Year	Organisation	Location	Highlight Eulogy (Video on YouTube)
1988	1409	Masjid al-Imam al-Husayn	Qom, Iran	Yikfi al-Hadhum Wil Nowh
1989	1410	al-Husayniya al-Zaynabiya	Qom, Iran	Lo Ridit Husn al-Aqiba
1990	1411	Husayniat al-Imam Ali	Damascus, Syria	Kilmen Yihasib Dhamira
1991	1412	al-Husayniya al-Zaynabiya	Qom, Iran	Goom Irwiha
1992	1413	al-Husayniya al-Zaynabiya	Qom, Iran	Ma Nidri Ya Walina
1993	1414	al-Husayniya al-Zaynabiya	Qom, Iran	Mahla al-Wida' al-Yawm
1994	1415	Husayniyat al-Rasool al-Adham - al-Karbalaeia/ Husayniyat Sayid Muhammad	Kuwait	Dhal Yijri Dam' al-Eyn
1995	1416	Husayniyat al-Rasool al-Adham - al-Karbalaeia	Kuwait	Hayarni al-Wakit
1996	1417	Husayniyat al-Rasool al-Adham - al-Karbalaeia	Kuwait	Tikshifha Tikshifha
1997	1418	Husayniyat al-Rasool al-Adham - al-Karbalaeia	Kuwait	al-Akbar Nisim'a
1998	1419	Husayniyat al-Rasool al-Adham - al-Karbalaeia	Kuwait	Zilim Wikhyool
1999	1420	Husayniyat al-Rasool al-Adham - al-Karbalaeia	Kuwait	al-Alam Al Gaa' Ya Haidar
2000	1421	Husayniyat al-Rasool al-Adham - al-Karbalaeia	Kuwait	Gabul Metrooh Withajir
2001	1422	Husayniyat al-Rasool al-Adham - al-Karbalaeia	Kuwait	Ilak Galbi Infija'
2002	1423	Husayniyat al-Qasab	Manama, Bahrain	Rayhanat al-Mustafa
2003	1424	Husayniyat al-Qasab	Manama, Bahrain	Yal Gasid Gabr Ihssain
2004	1425	Husayniyat al-Qasab	Manama, Bahrain	Bil Khiyma Farha
2005	1426	Al-Hussaini Association	London, UK	Ma A'lam Ibya Yawm
2006	1427	Al-Hussaini Association	London, UK	Hatha Inta Yabn al-Kerrar
2007	1428	Al-Hussaini Association	London, UK	Ya Galbi Ya Sabir
2008	1429	Husayniyat al-Qasab	Manama, Bahrain	Ilahi Rid Gharib al-Dar
2009 (Jan)	1430	Husayniyat al-Rasool al-Adham - al-Karbalaeia	Kuwait	Yahssain Awal Ma Habeyna
2009 (Dec)	1431	Husayniyat al-Rasool al-Adham - al-Karbalaeia	London, UK	Ashofak Kil Fajir
2010	1432	Husayniyat al-Rasool al-Adham - al-Karbalaeia	Kuwait	Ana al-Qahir
2011	1433	Husayniyat Dawood al-Ashoor	Basra, Iraq	Dumti Karbala
2012	1434	Husayniyat Ashor	Kuwait	Ghadhab Rab al-Ibad
2013	1435	Husayniyat Dawood al-Ashoor	Basra, Iraq	La Tinsa al-Wasiya
2014	1436	Husayniyat Dawood al-Ashoor	Basra, Iraq	Kil Ma Ashoofak
2015	1437	Husayniyat Dawood al-Ashoor	Basra, Iraq	Gooman Banat al-Nabi
2016	1438	Husayniyat Dawood al-Ashoor	Basra, Iraq	Yuma Atamnich Alaya
2017	1439	Husayniyat Dawood al-Ashoor	Basra, Iraq	Yabu Fadhil
2018	1440	Al-Akbar Foundation	London, UK	Beyn al-Mehdi Wil Abbas
2019	1441	Al-Akbar Foundation/Dewan al-Kafeel	London, UK	Ballah Ya Nahar
2021	1443	Hey'at Jawad al-A'immah	Al-Aziziyah, Iraq	Solaf Waya Chaffa
2022	1444	Qa'at Baghdad al Kubra	Baghdad, Iraq	Tijaz Ya May
2023	1445	Qa'at Baghdad al Kubra	Baghdad, Iraq	Ya Sukayna
2024	1446	Jami' al-Rasool al-Adham	Baghdad, Iraq	Khuttat Harub
2025	1447	Hussainiyat Alaghile	Ahwaz, Iran	Ma Hassabit Hel Kithir
2026	1448	Hussainiyat Umm al-Hasan	Basra, Iraq	Fargat Warid

== Discography ==
=== Studio albums ===
- Wa Fatimatah (O Fatima) (1993) [Um al-Banin Foundation]
- Wa Tabqa Lana (It Remains For Us) (2000) [Um al-Banin Foundation]
- Ya Hussain (O' Husayn) (2002) [Karbala Records]
- Labayk Ya Husayn (Here We Are O' Husayn) (2003) [Karbala Records]
- al-Razaya (The Tragedies) (2003) [Karbala Records]
- al-Imam al-Hassan al-Masmoom (Imam Hassan the Poisoned) [Fadak Records]
- al-Zahra Fi Karbala (Zahra in Karbala) (2004) [Karbala Records]
- Al-Adl al-Samawi (Justice of the Skies) (2004) [Aniss al-Nofoss]
- Ya Fatima (O' Fatima) (2004) [Karbala Records]
- Bintu Muhammad (Muhammad's Daughter) (2004) [al-Thaqalayn Records]
- Wali Allah (Guardian of Allah) (2004) [al-Thaqalayn Records]
- Awdat al-Sabaya (Return of the Captives) (2004) [Karbala Records]
- Nowh Iw Dami (Wails and Tears) (2004) [al-Thaqalayn Records]
- Karbala (2005) [Karbala Records]
- Mata al-Multaqa (When Is The Meeting) (2005) [al-Thaqalayn Records]
- Uqsuduni (Come to Me) (2005) [Karbala Records]
- Baad Ma Ashufak (I Will Not See You Again) (2006) [Anwar al-Huda Records]
- Wahi al-Qawafi (Soul of the Words) (2006) [al-Thaqalayn Records]
- Qaws al-Sama' (Bow of the Sky) (2006) [Karbala Records]
- Ya Bab Fatima (O' Door of Fatima) (2006) [Karbala Records]
- Usali Alayka (I Pray Upon You) (2007) [al-Hayat Media]
- Kalim al-Husayn (He Who Speaks to Husayn) (2007) [Thulfqiar Centre]
- Sawad al-Layl (The Blackness of the Night) (2007) [al-Faqih Library]
- Wujudun Li Wujudi (Presence To My Presence) (2007) [ِAnwar al-Huda]
- Sarab (Oasis) (2007) [al-Thaqalayn Records]
- Lahn al-Dima (The Melody of Blood) (2008) [al-Hayat Media]
- Lil Bukaa Baqiya (There Is Still Time To Mourn) (January 2008) [al-Hayat Media]
- Kahf al-Wara (The Cave of the World) (January 2008) [al-Thaqalayn Records]
- Sawt al-Rayah (The Voice of the Banner) (February 2008) [al-Raya al-Imamiya]
- Bani Hashim (January 2009) [al-Thaqalayn Records]
- Ayat al-Sabr (The Verses of Patience) (January 2009) [Anwar al-Huda]
- al-Mahkamah (The Court) (February 2009) [al-Raya al-Imamiya]
- Shajar al-Arak (Tree of Arak) (December 2009) [al-Faqih Library]
- Inaha Taqool (She Says) (December 2009) [BK Media]
- Qul Ma Tasha (Say What You Like) (December 2010) [al-Thaqalayn Records]
- Ra'ayt al-Husayn (I Saw Husayn) (December 2010) [Anwar al-Huda]
- Uthama (Greats) (June 2010) [Thulfiqar Centre]
- Tezuruni (You Visit Me) (January 2011) [Karbala Records]
- Shams (Sun) (November 2011) [al-Ahrar Media]
- Laka Antami (I Belong To You) (November 2011) [ِAnwar al-Huda]
- Yisajelny (He Registers Me) (December 2011) [BK Media]
- Majaninak (Your Insanes) (November 2012) [BK Media]
- Kuntu Wala Zilt (I Was, And I Remain) (November 2012) [BK Media]
- Uthama 2 (Greats 2) (July 2013) [Thulfiqar Centre]
- Hathihi al-Hikaya (This Story) (November 2013) [BK Media]
- Tilka al-Sarkha (That Scream) (November 2013) [BK Media]
- Qaedona al-Husayn (Our Leader is Husayn) (October 2014) [BK Media]
- Salla al-Mawt (Death Prayer) (October 2014) [BK Media]
- Maat al-Maa (Water is Dead) (October 2015) [BK Media]
- Yawm al-Arbaeen (The Day of Arbaeen) (November 2015) [BK Media]
- Banat al-Nabi (Daughters of the Prophet) (September 2016) [BK Media]
- Basim (September 2017) [BK Media]
- 1440 (September 2018) [BK Media]
- 1443 (July 2021) [BK Media]
- 1444 (July 2022) [BK Media]
