= List of mills in Germany =

Baumwollspinnereien is both the term in German for a cotton mill, and used as a prefix in the name of a cotton spinning company. A location where cotton was processed into cloth was also called a Textilverarbeitungsanlagen.

== Germany ==
- de:Mechanische Baumwollspinnerei und Weberei Augsburg, Bayern
- de:Baumwollspinnerei Max Ebenauer & Co., Bayern
- de:Baumwollspinnerei Kolbermoor, Bayern
- Grevener Baumwollspinnerei, Nordrhein-Westfalen
- Baumwollspinnerei Ermen & Engels, Engelskirchen, Nordrhein-Westfalen
- de:Crefelder Baumwoll-Spinnerei, Krefeld, Nordrhein-Westfalen
- Baumwollspinnerei Hammerstein, Wuppertal, Nordrhein-Westfalen
- Textilfabrik Cromford
- de:VEB Vereinigte Baumwollspinnereien und Zwirnereien Flöha, Sachsen
- Leipziger Baumwollspinnerei, Sachsen (de), Sachsen
- Alte Baumwollspinnerei St. Ingbert(de), Saarland
- de:Baumwollspinnerei Leinefelde, Thüringen
- (see also: de:Liste von Baumwollspinnereien im deutschsprachigen Raum and de:Kategorie:Baumwollspinnerei)

== Austria ==
- de:Harlander Coats, St. Pölten, Niederösterreich
- Baumwollspinnerei Teesdorf, Niederösterreich
- Pottendorfer Baumwollspinnerei Niederösterreich

== Switzerland ==
- de:General-Societät der englischen Baumwollspinnerei in St. Gallen
- Spinnerei Hard, Winterthur
