= Baumwollspinnerei Hammerstein =

- Location within Germany

Cotton
- Current status: Closed 1869
- Location: Wuppertal, Germany
- Owner: Johann Christian Jung
- Coordinates: 51.2339°N 7.0894°E

Construction
- Built: 1835
- Completed: 1837
- Height: 20.5 metres (67 ft)
- Other dimensions: 46 metres (151 ft)×15.5 metres (51 ft)
- Floor count: 6

Design team
- Architect: Christian Heyden

The Baumwollspinnerei Hammerstein was a cotton mill which had accompanying weaving sheds, located in the area now known as Wuppertal, Germany. It was the largest of its type in Bergisches Land and was owned by the Jung family between 1835 and 1869, when it also included a textile school.

== Location ==
The name Hammerstein can be traced to the Rittergut Hammerstein in Vohwinkel, now part of Wuppertal, Germany. Wuppertal in its present borders was formed in 1929 by merging the early industrial settlements of Barmen and Elberfeld with Vohwinkel, Ronsdorf, Cronenberg, Langerfeld, and Beyenburg. The initial name of the town, Barmen-Elberfeld, was changed in a 1930 referendum to Wuppertal (“Wupper Valley”). The Hammerstein manor house controlled much of the valley floor of the Wupper. In 1825 it gave its name to the Villa Hammerstein in Sonnborn, that still stands on the Hammersteiner Allee, and to a station of the suspension railway. Sonnborn itself gave its name to the Sonnborner Kreuz on the autobahn 46 and autobahn 535.

== History ==
Downhill from the Villa Hammerstein, the businessman Johann Christian Jung built the weaving sheds and the cotton mill Baumwollspinnerei Hammerstein alongside the Wupper between 1835 and 1837. He included workers accommodation in the form of an apartment block.

The "state-of-the-art" six-storey mill was designed by the architect Christian Heyden; it is 46 metres long, 15.5 metres wide and 20.5 metres high.

The mill was notably large and Levin Schücking in his 1856 publication „Eisenbahnfahrt von Minden nach Köln“ wrote that in Vohwinkel one entered the valley of the Wupper with the industrial towns of Barmen and Elberfeld lying ahead:

… Gegend, die vom anziehendsten Gemisch von Gärten und Wiesen, schimmernden Landsitzen, Siedlungen der Fabrikarbeiter, Industrieanlagen vom kleinen Mühlenwerk bis zur riesigen Spindelkaserne und Webstuhlpalast, von Brücken und farbenglänzenden Färbereien und Bleichereien unübersehbar weit bedeckt und malerisch überstreit ist.

(Note: a mixture of gardens and meadows, shimmering mansions, housing for the factory workers, Industrial sites from the smallest mill to the giant barrack blocks for spindles, and palaces for looms: of bridges and countless glistening outpourings from the dye shops and bleachers that cover and paint the countryside a free translation)

The Hammersteiner Baumwollspinnerei, the largest buildings in the valley were the „riesigen Spindelkaserne“ und „Webstuhlpalast“- the giant barracks for spindles, and palace for looms. The firm, at that time, had spinning machines with a capacity of 20000 spindles and a 100 operating looms, which produced 600,000 pounds (270,000 kg) of yarn.

The Hammersteiner Baumwollspinnerei of F. A. Jung was reported closed in 1869. In 1938, 20 families lived in the workers' quarters, who were Gastarbeiter from Kirchen, 50 miles to the south east where the Jung family had their first mill, Spinnerei Jungenthal, established in 1799. This is the same family that operated the Jung Jungenthal locomotive works.

The highway interchange Sonnborner Kreuz highway interchange has transformed 24 ha of the Sonnborn end of Wuppertal. It was started in 1968 and opened on 16 May 1974, it cost 150 Million DM. In total 65 buildings containing 576 apartments were demolished, 2000 inhabitants were resettled. The factory lay beneath a feed-in road: buildings were lost.

== Gallery ==
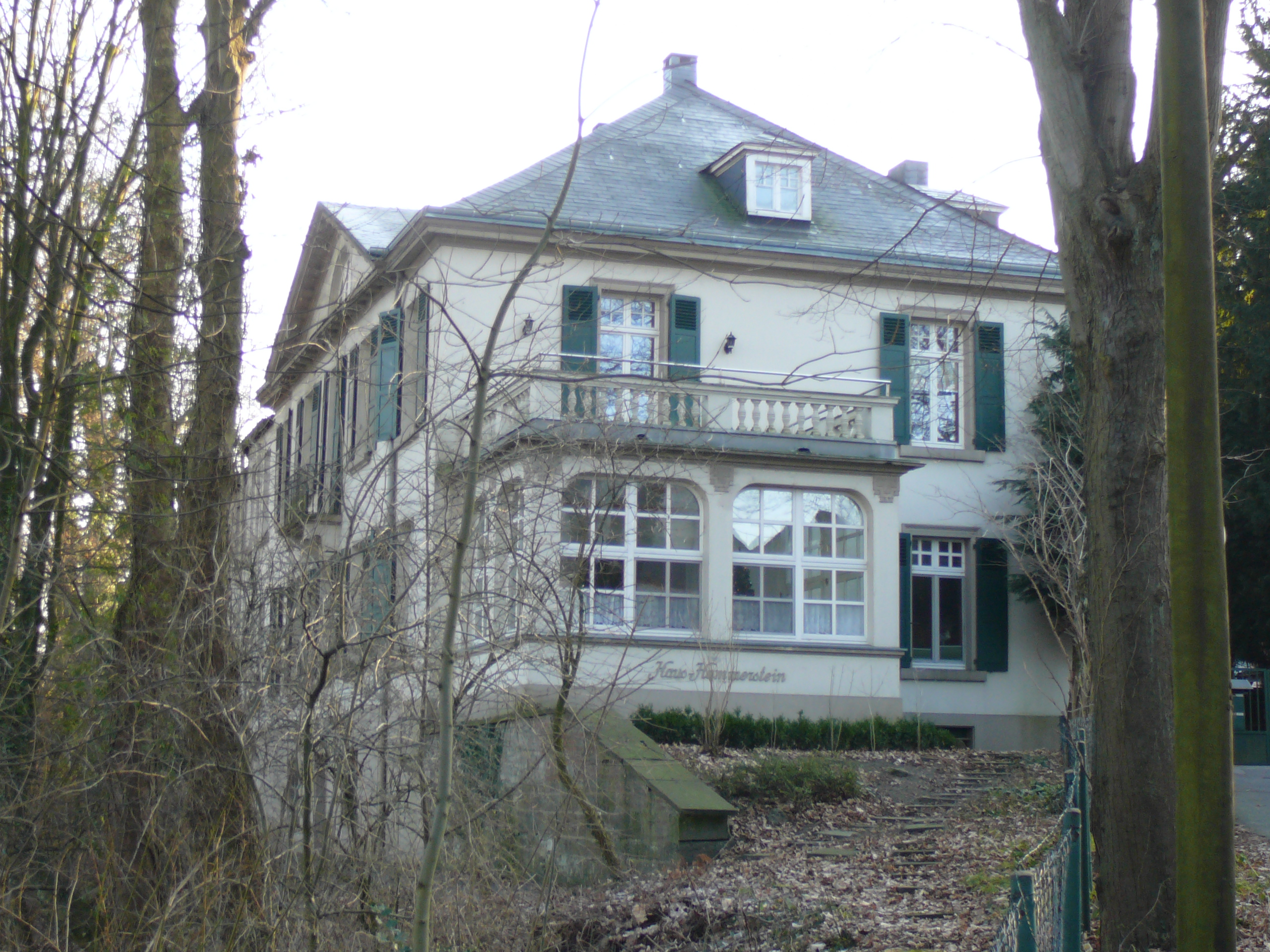
Villa Hammerstein

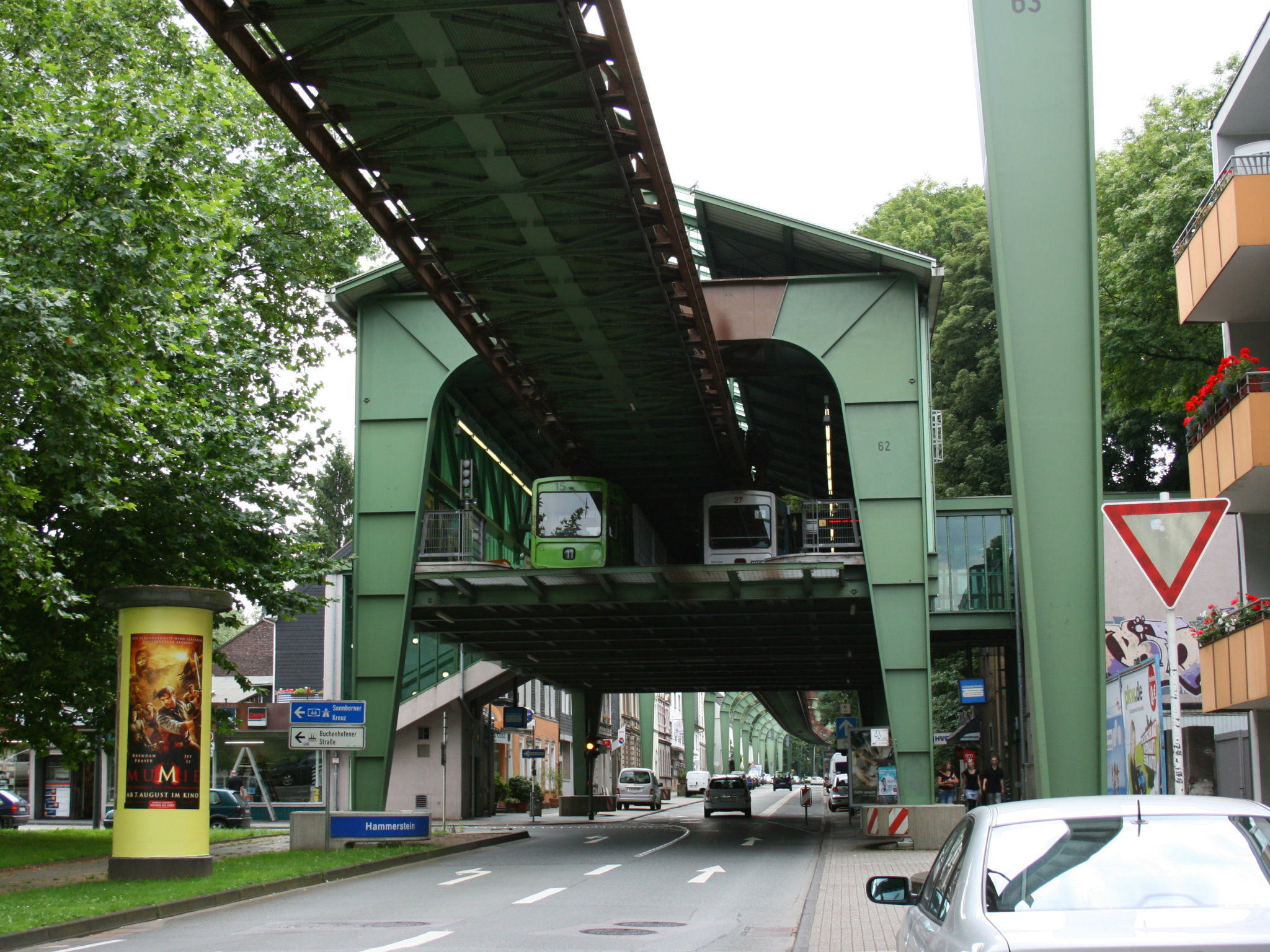
Schwebebahnstation Hammerstein

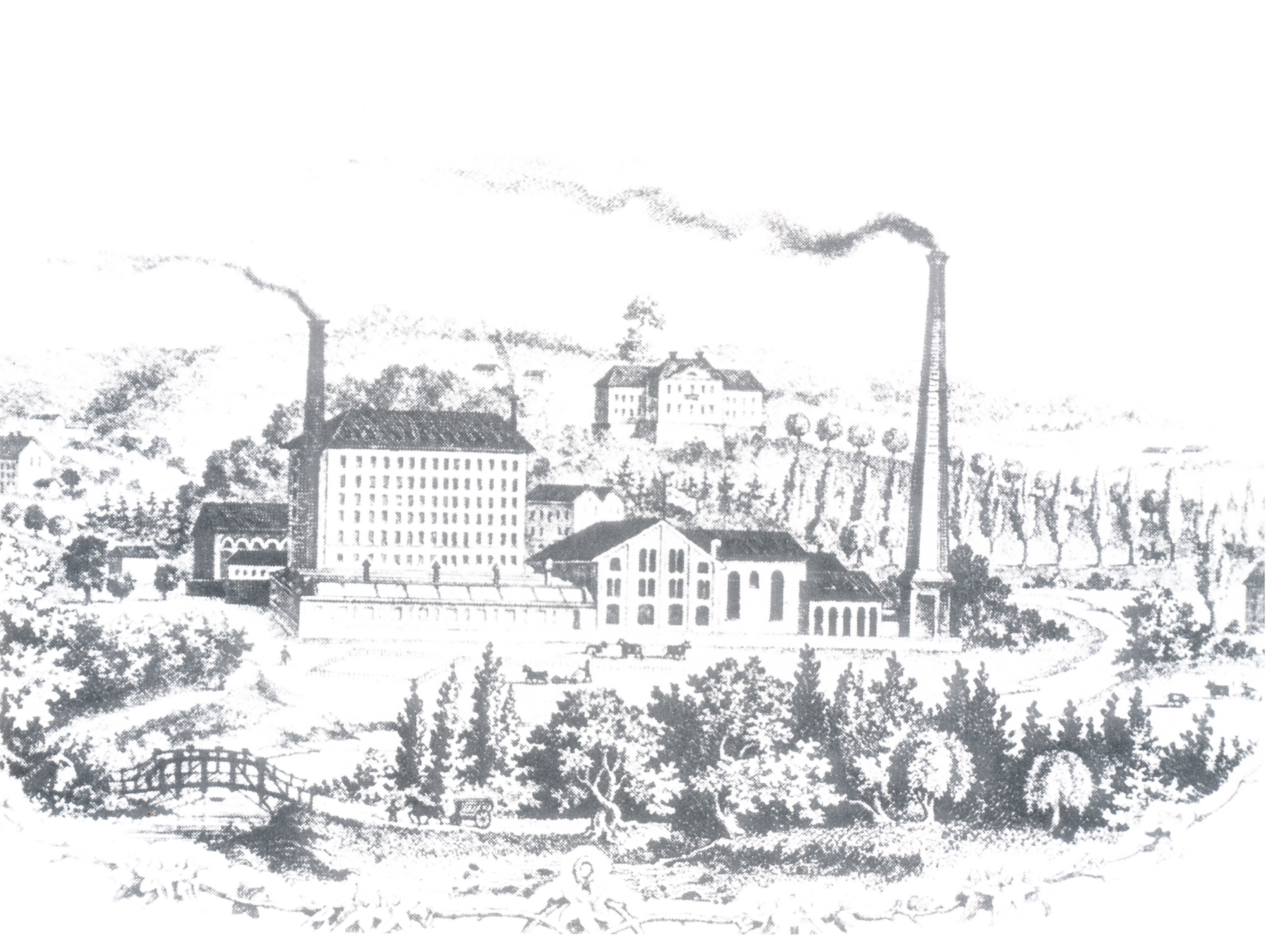
Baumwollspinnerei Hammerstein in 1850

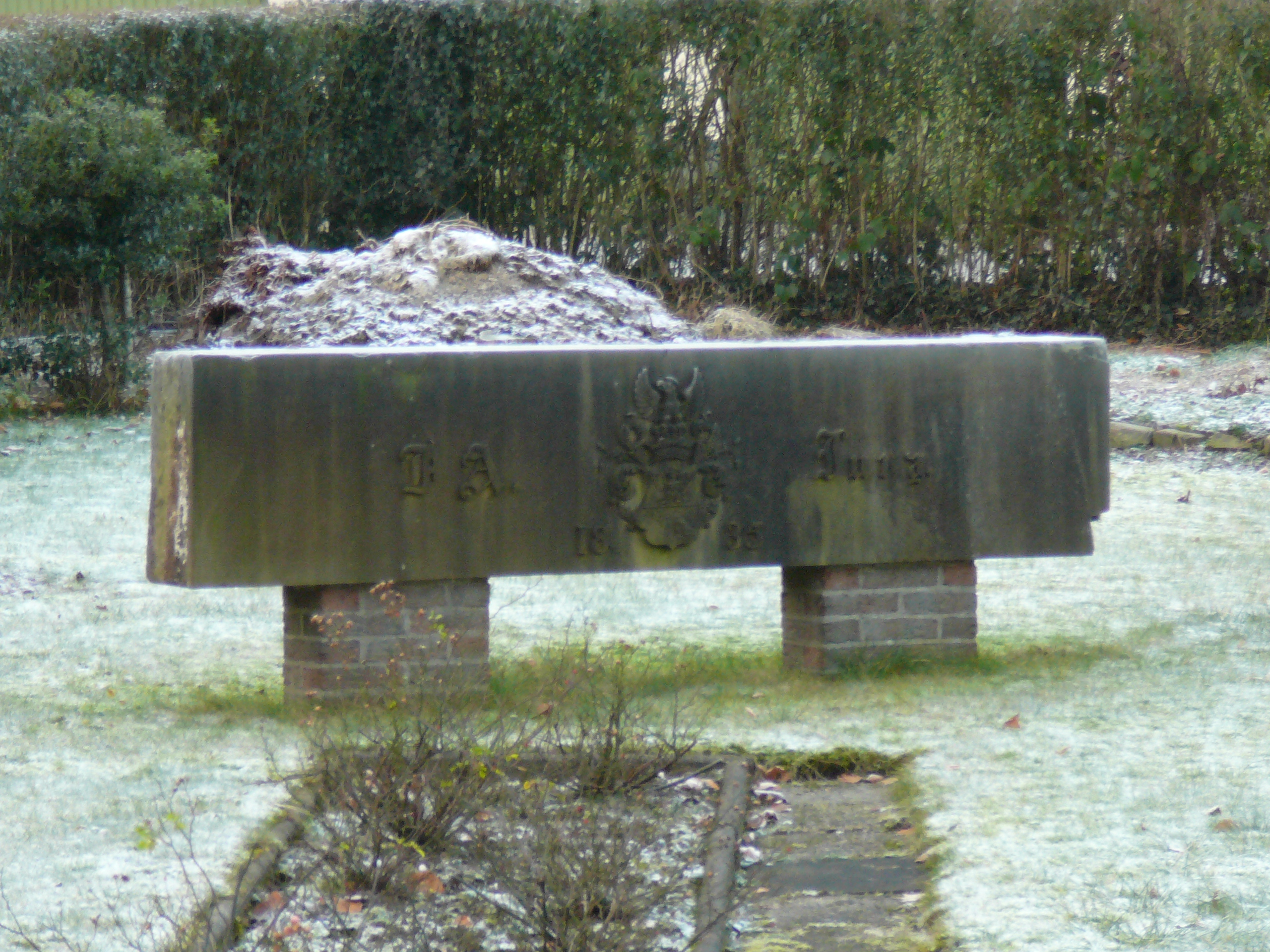
F. A. Jung company coat of arms

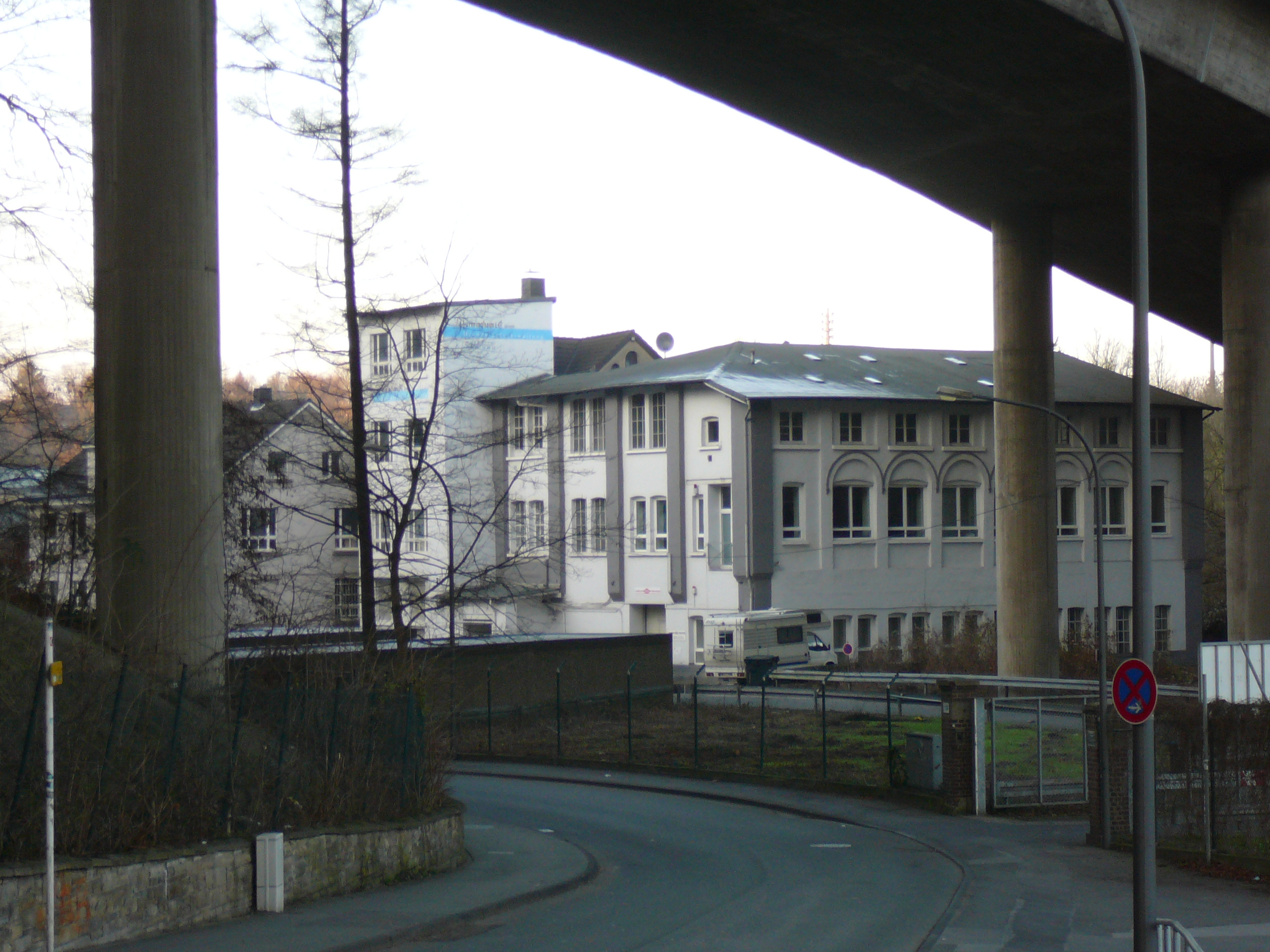
On the premises of the former cotton mill, there is an Industrial park, where some spinning may recommence.
