= Große Kirche Aplerbeck =

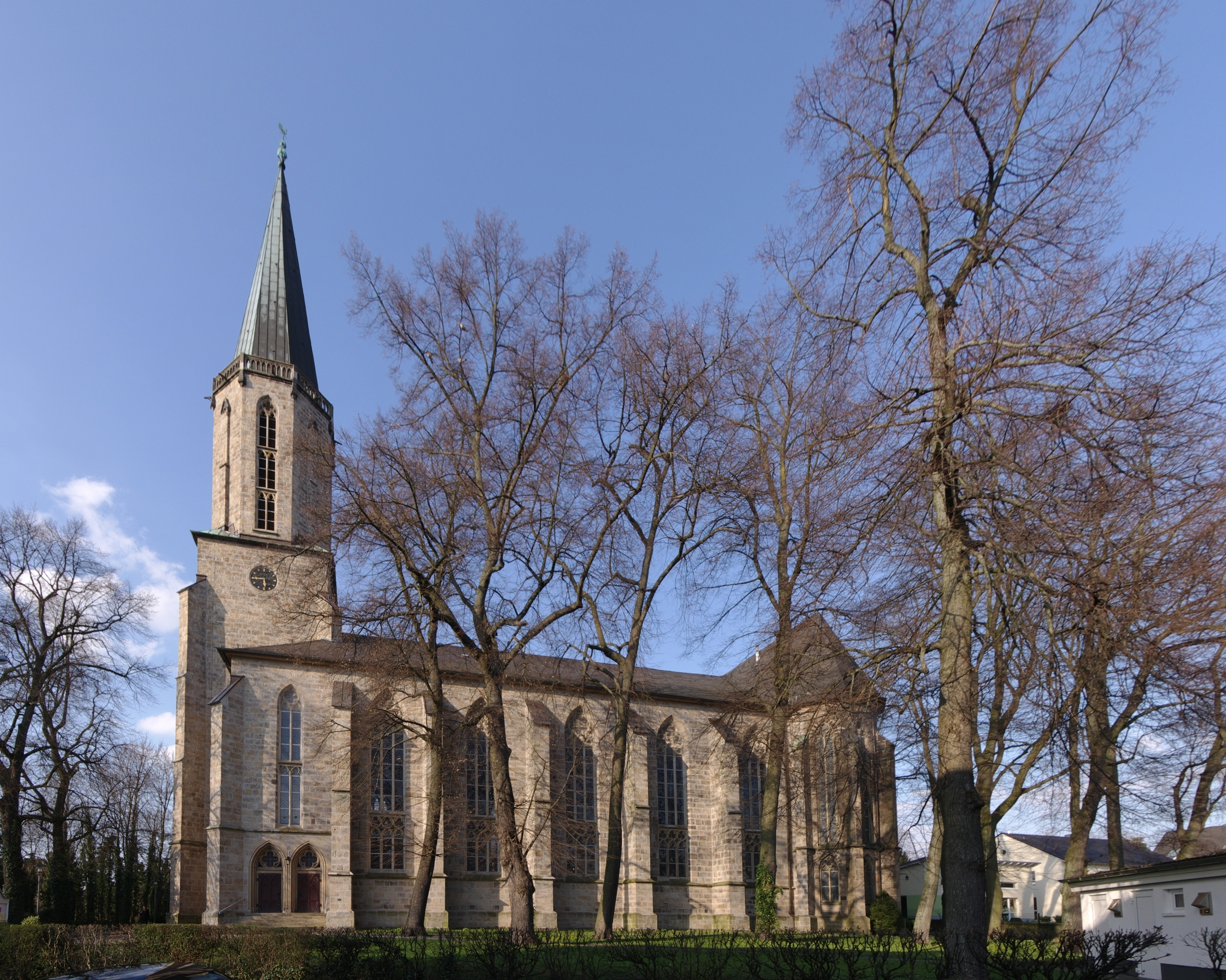

- 51°29′44″N 7°33′30″E
- Location: Aplerbeck, North Rhine-Westphalia
- Country: Germany
- Denomination: Protestant
- Website: www.georgsgemeinde.de

History
- Consecrated: 1869

Architecture
- Architect: Christian Heyden
- Architectural type: Hall church
- Style: Gothic Revival
- Completed: 1869

Administration
- Parish: Evangelische Georgs-Kirchengemeinde Dortmund

The Große Kirche Aplerbeck is a Protestant church in Aplerbeck, now part of Dortmund, Germany. It was built from 1867 to 1869 in Gothic Revival style, designed by Christian Heyden. A listed monument, it is used by the parish St. Georg, serving mostly as a concert church.

== History ==
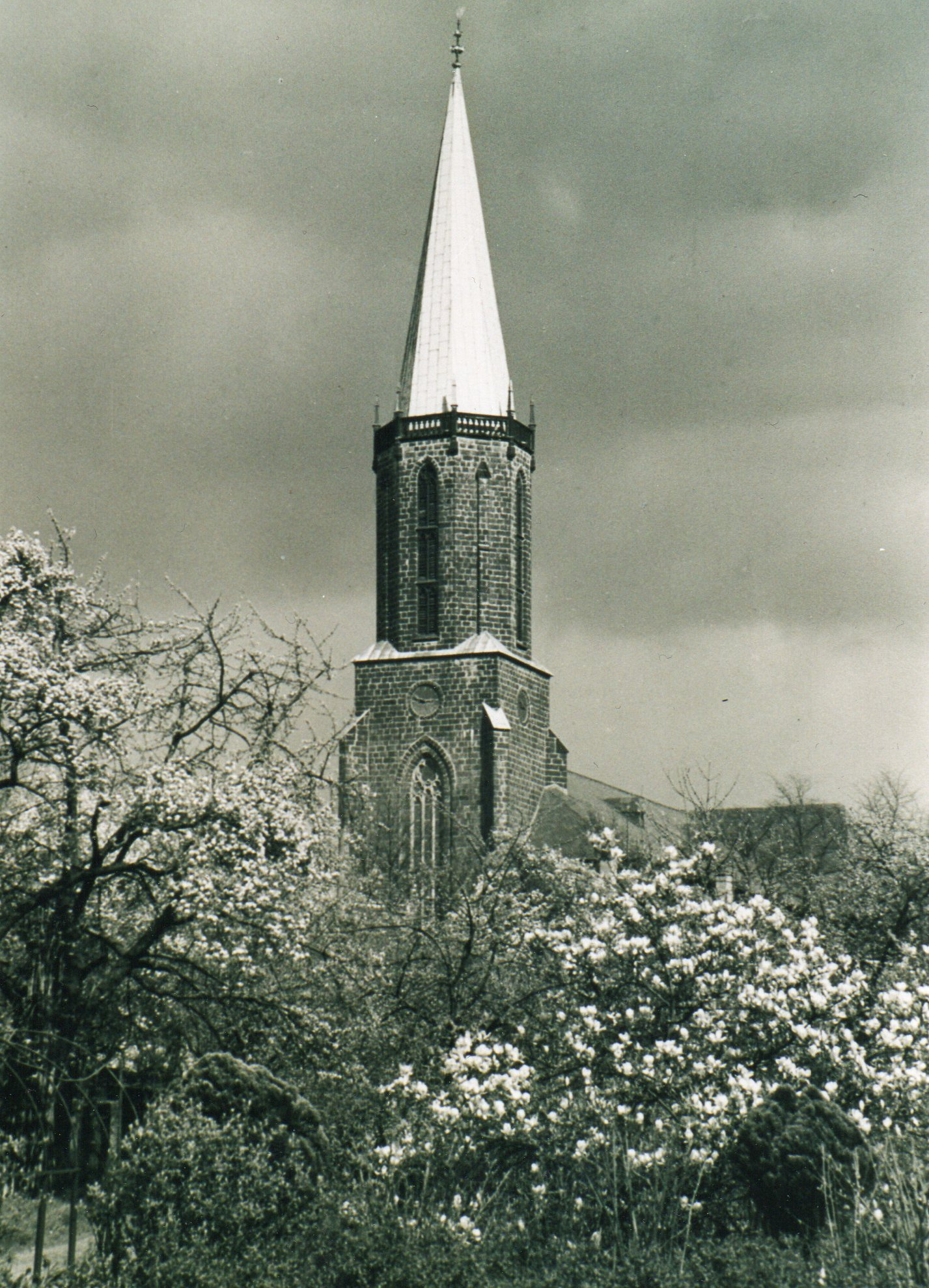
The steeple in the 1960s

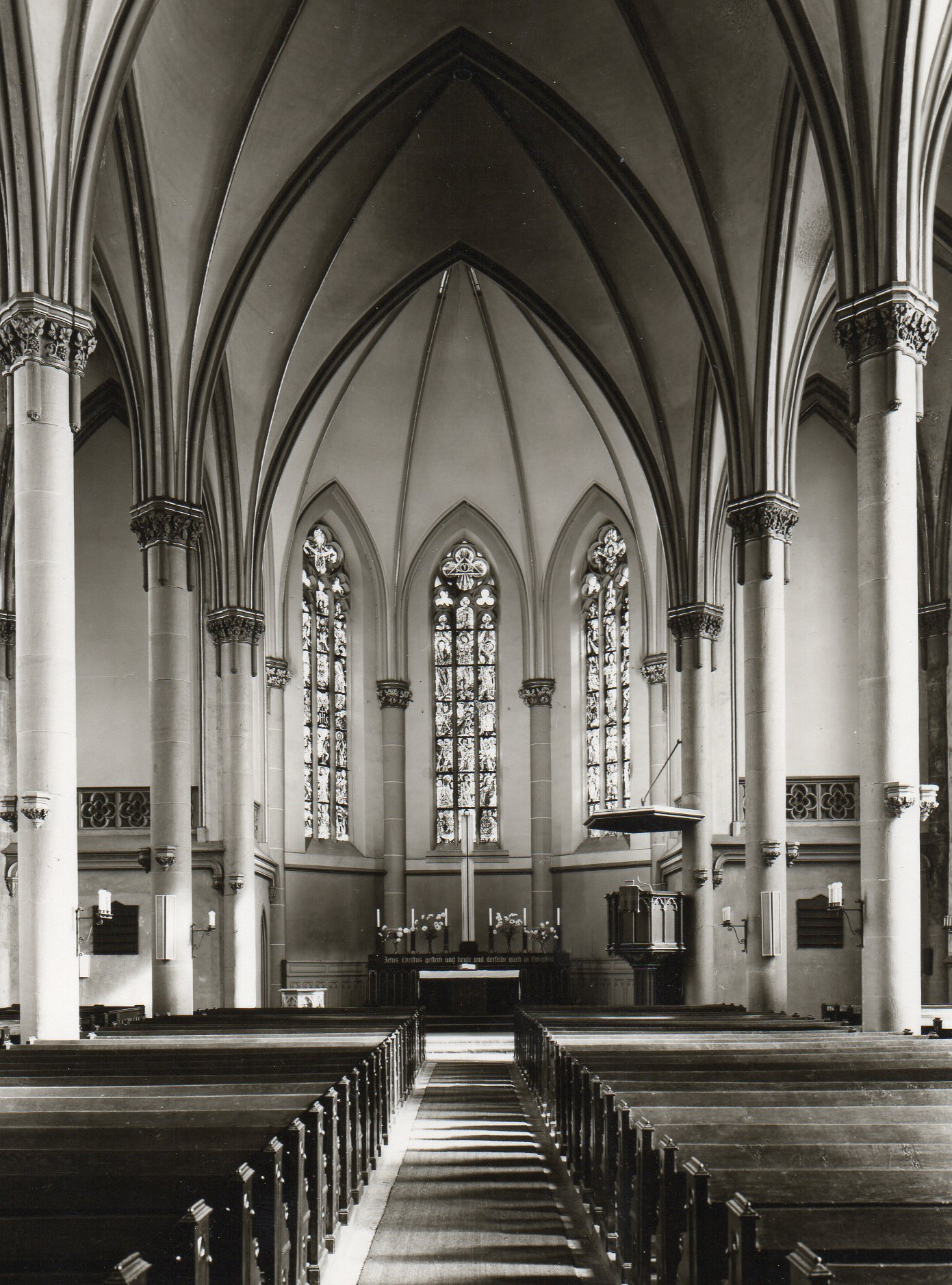
Interior c. 1967

In the 19th century, the population of Aplerbeck increased due to industrialisation. The medieval church Georgskirche was too small. The new church, which was left without a name for a long time, was built from 1867 in Gothic Revival style on a design by Christian Heyden, who built the same church in Gütersloh. A design for galleries, to increase the space for 1,200 people, was never realised.

The church was inaugurated on 15 December 1869, without giving it a name. Locally, it was called the Protestant church ("Evangelische Kirche"). Another name was Black Church ("Schwarze Kirche") because the paint of the ceiling had darkened. The church was located in the Kirchstraße (Church Street) until Aplerbeck became part of Dortmund in 1929, and the ambiguous street name was changed to Märtmannstraße.

On 12 April 1945, US troops waited to enter Aplerbeck. The sexton hoisted a white flag as a sign of capitulation, while another white flag was hoisted at the town hall, which made a peaceful entry possible.

From 1999, the church was mostly used for concerts, and was consistently called "Große Kirche".

== Building ==
The church is a hall church with three naves of five bays and a prominent choir. The walls are structured by buttresses and tracery windows. The interior is structured by slender columns with leaf capitals, which support a high rib vault.

=== Steeple ===
The high steeple in the west is a landmark, reaching 60.90 metres (199.8 ft). It has a quadrangle floor, with an octagonal upper part and a helmet topped by a weathercock. Four sides of the upper part, those parallel with the lower part, carry high abat-sons, while the diagonal walls are decorated with lesenes. The pointed helmet with copper shingles is framed by balusters at the bottom.

=== Furnishing ===
The company Schulze & Söhne from Paulinzella, Thuringia, who built the organ, also installed the altar and the pulpit. The painting on the high altar, showing a Crucifixion scene, was created in 1885 by Paul Händler. While many furnishings designed by Heyden were changed over the years, the painting has been returned to the church.

=== Church music ===
The organ was built by Schulze & Söhne. It was inaugurated on 15 December 1869, and approved on 1 October 1870. It was improved in 1935 by Walcker, adding pipes, installing electrical tracture and changing the console. Further improvements by Walcker followed in 1939, such as changing stops.

In 1870 already, people complained about the long reverberation in the building of seven seconds. In 1967, Albert Eisenberg, an international acoustics specialist, recommended new benches with textile cushioning. From 1999, the church has been used mostly for concerts.

== Historic monument ==
In 1967, the parish requested listing of the building as a historic monument (Denkmal), because it needed major repair which the parish could not afford. It was declared an example of a neo-Gothic hall church of rare unity of style ("ein Beispiel einer neugotischen Hallenkirche von seltener Geschlossenheit" on 6 December 1967.

Siegfried Liesenberg wrote a guide book in 2001, Der Zeigefinger Gottes. Zur Geschichte der Großen Kirche Aplerbeck in der Märtmannstraße., which translates to God's Index Finger, about the history of the Große Kirche in the Märtmannstraße.

== Gallery ==
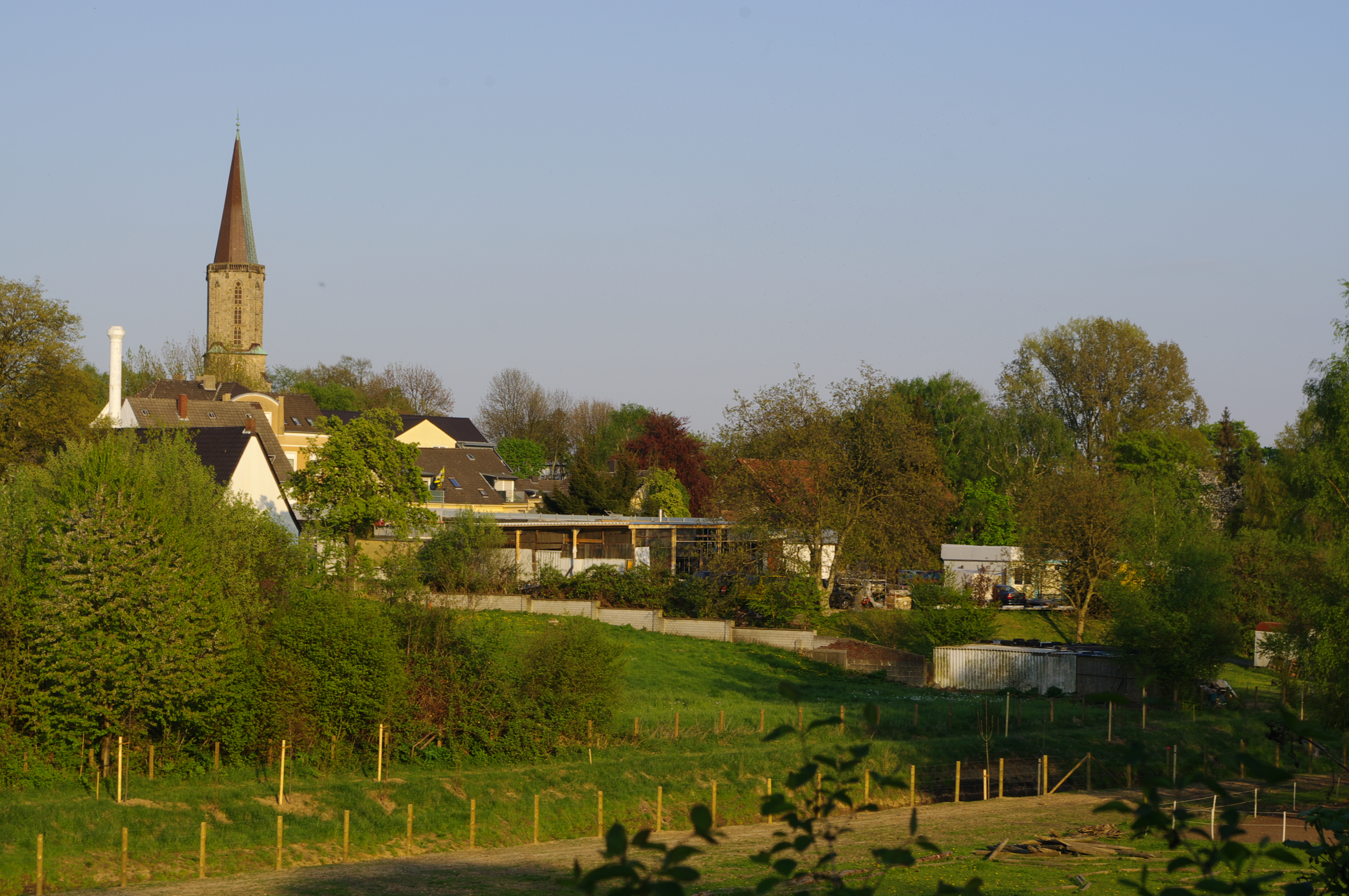
View from the east, 2011

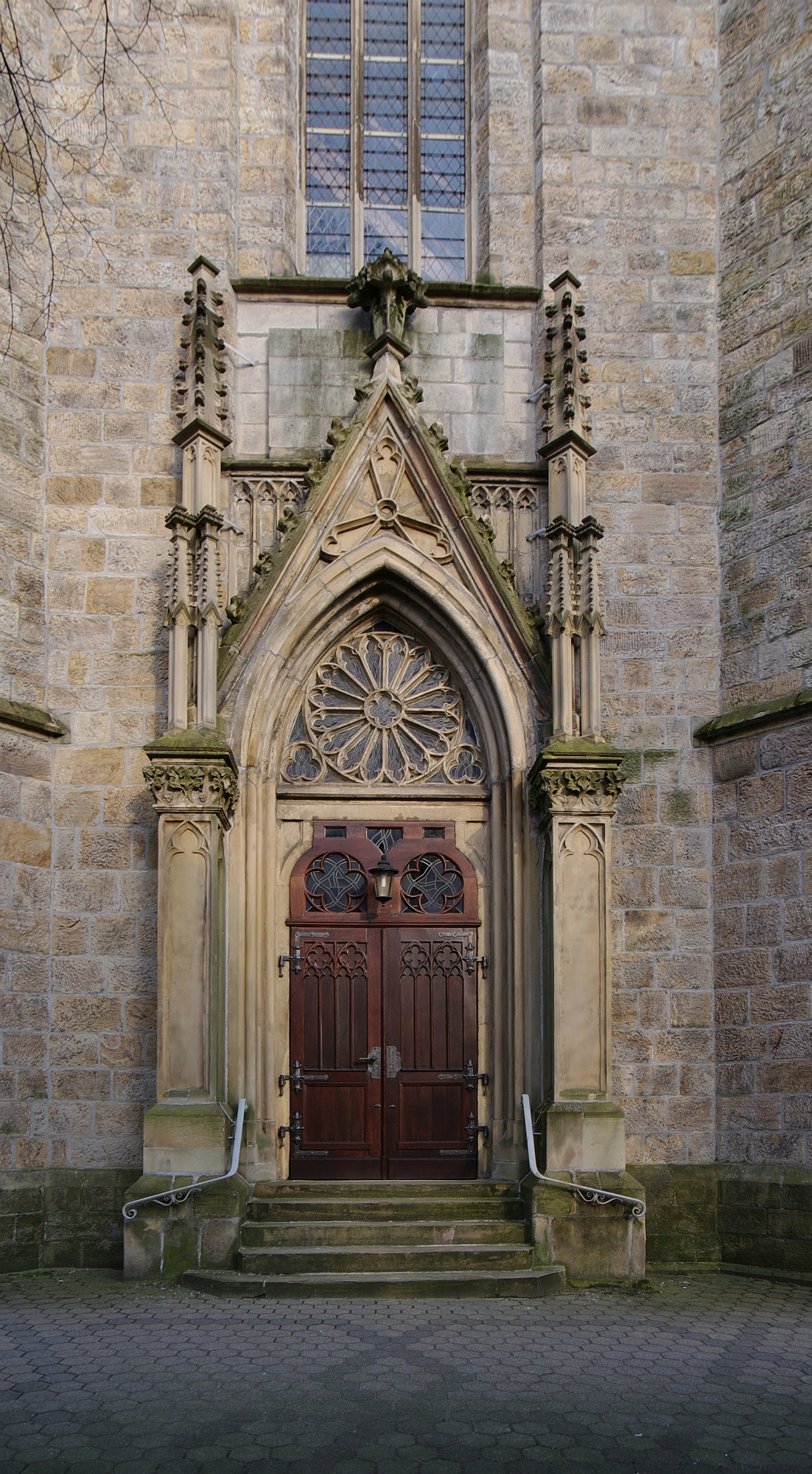
Main Entrance from the south

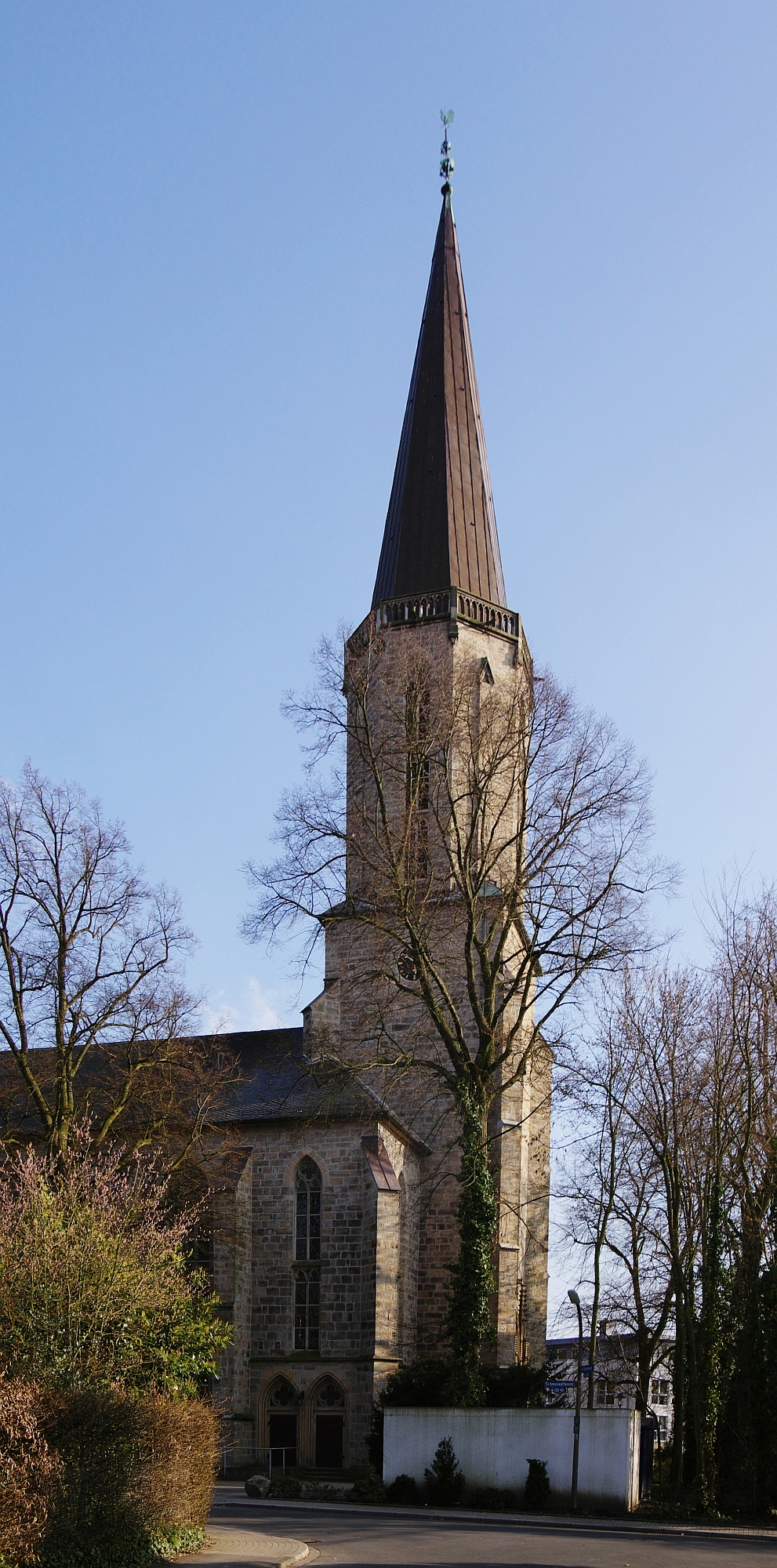
The steeple from the north

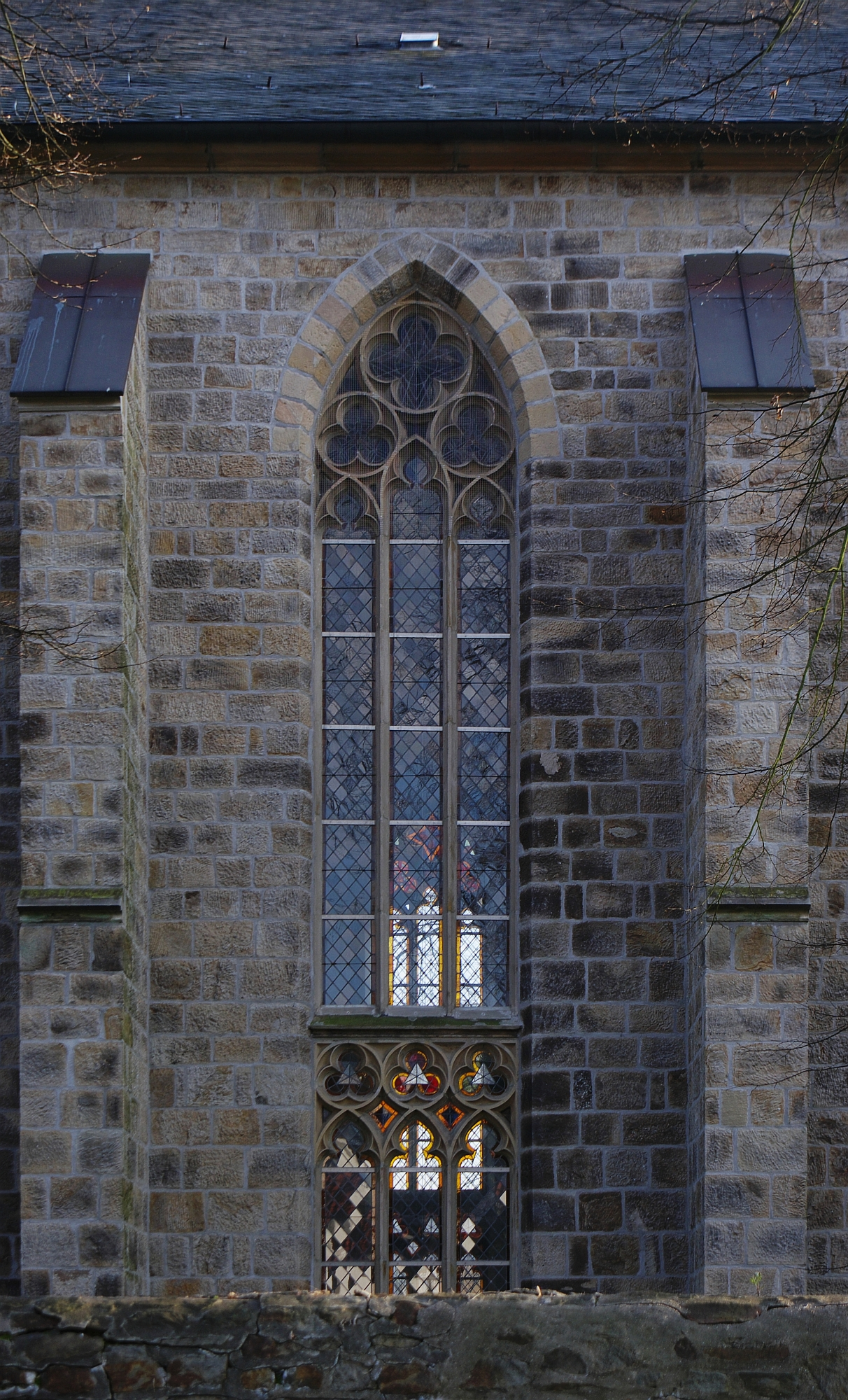
A window

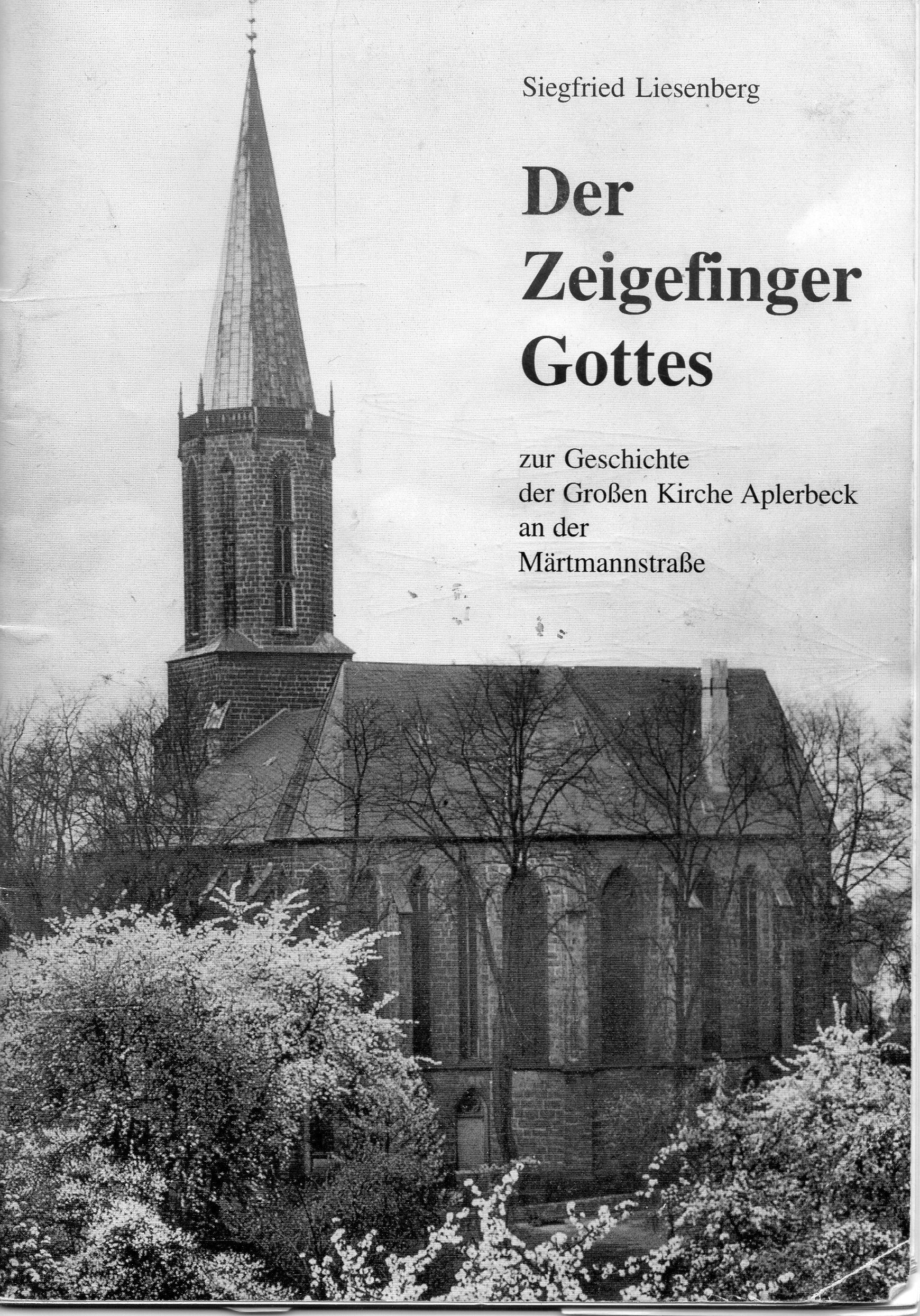
Title of a guide book, God's Index Finger

== Literature ==
- Ursula Quednau (ed.): Dehio-Handbuch der deutschen Kunstdenkmäler, Nordrhein-Westfalen II: Westfalen. Deutscher Kunstverlag, Berlin / München 2011, ISBN 978-3-422-03114-2, p. 269.
