= Heinz Eberhard Strüning =

German painter and graphic artist (1896–1986)

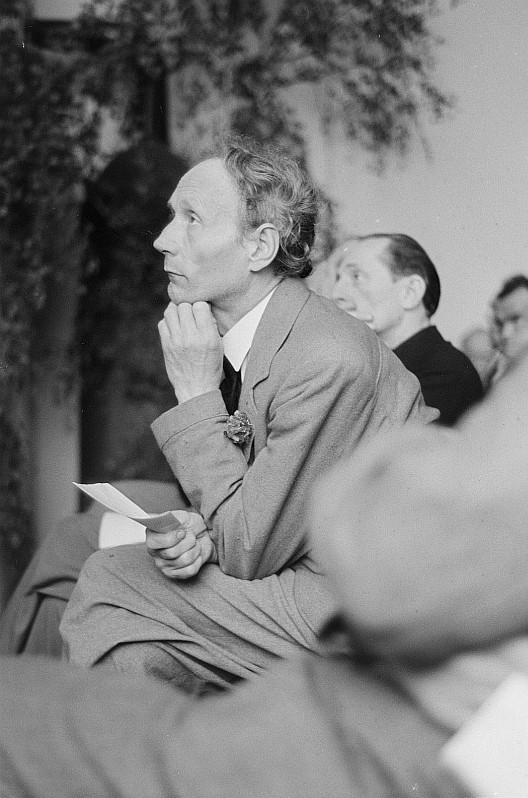
Heinz Eberhard Strüning 1949

Heinz Eberhard Strüning (2 May 1896 – 11 March 1986) was a German painter, graphic artist and pastel painter.

== Life ==
Born in Aplerbeck, Strüning studied at the Dresden Academy of Fine Arts from 1922 to 1924 and at the Kunsthochschule Kassel from 1925 to 1926. From 1927, he was a resident of Leipzig and from 1937 until his death he lived in Machern (Saxony). From 1947 to 1951 he taught as a lecturer at the Hochschule für Grafik und Buchkunst Leipzig and since then he worked as a freelance artist in Machern. Among others, he was a teacher of Gerhard Eichhorn. Strüning was a member of the Verband Bildender Künstler der DDR. An increasing eye complaint led to blindness in 1984. Strüning once said about himself: "I create from the full, because I am filled to the top with what I want to create. There is only one law for me: to create until the last, that is what I live for. That is my artistic postulate, my inner law.

Strüning died in Machern at the age of 89.

== Work ==
The Leipzig University Custody published a catalogue of his works in 1986. Many of them are university-owned, such as the painting "Swans", charcoal drawing over pastels. A work called "Trees" by Strüning has been hanging in the mayor's room of the Machern town hall since 1997. Another work is "Dorfstraße in Machern", pastel, created in 1950.

== Exhibitions ==
=== Individual exhibitions ===
- 1948: Halle (Saale)
- 1956: in der Galerie Henning in Halle (Saale)
- 1958: im Museum der bildenden Künste in Leipzig
- 1976: bis 1986 Leipzig, ferner Dresden, Altenburg und Ahrenshoop

=== Participation in exhibitions ===
- 1949 and 1972: Deutsche Kunstausstellung bzw. Kunstausstellung der DDR
- from 1972: regelmäßige Teilnahme an der Bezirkskunstausstellung Leipzig
