= Johann Friedrich Schulze =

German organ builder (1793–1858)

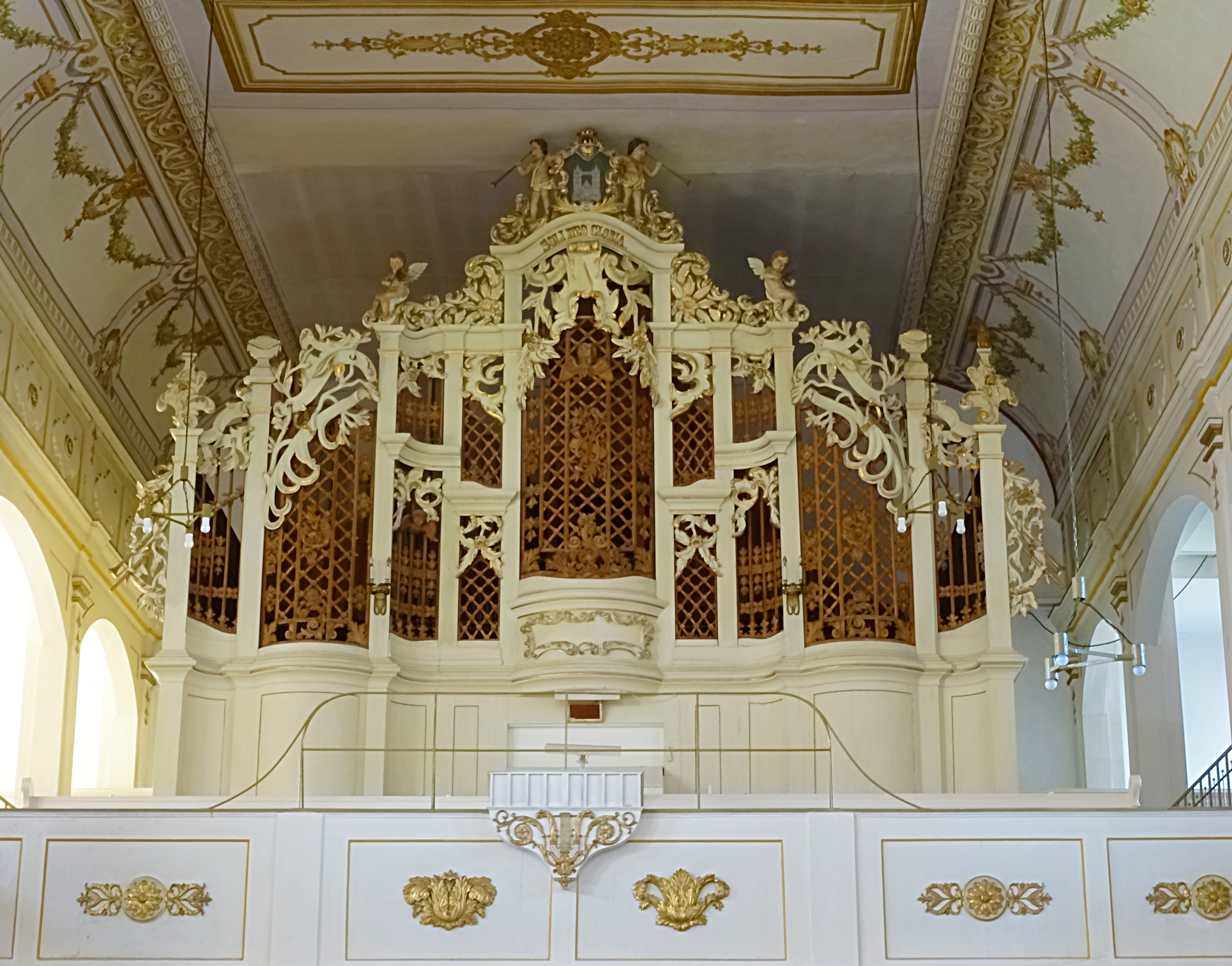
- His work, the organ at St. Marien in Stadtilm
- Born: 27 January 1793; Milbitz
- Died: 1 January 1858 (aged 64); Paulinzella
- Occupation: Organ builder

Johann Friedrich Schulze (27 January 1793 – 9 January 1858) was a German organ builder, from a family of organ builders. The company built major organs in Northern Germany and England.

== Career ==
Schulze was born in Milbitz, the only child of Johann Andreas Schulze (1753–1806) and his wife. In 1806, he joined his father's company, trained by Johann Benjamin Witzmann in Stadtilm. He founded his own company in 1815 and moved its location in 1826 to Paulinzella. He was known as one of Europe's most famous organ builders. He and Eberhard Friedrich Walcker are regarded as leaders in productivity and progressivity in the trade.

Schulze married Johanna Dorothea Sophia (née Kühn) from Oberrottenbach in 1820. They had a daughter and six sons, two of whom, Edmund Schulze and Eduard Schulze (1830–1880), also became organ builders. Among his students were Friedrich Wilhelm Winzer, Friedrich Albert Mehmel, Wilhelm Heerwagen and the brothers Karl-August and Heinrich Louis Witzmann. He died in Paulinzella.

His two sons took over the family business, named "J. F. Schulzes Söhne". They were assisted by their brother Oskar Schulze (1825–1878), and another brother, Herwart Schulze (1836–1908), who worked as a sculptor. In 1881, when all brothers had died, the company was dissolved.

== Works ==
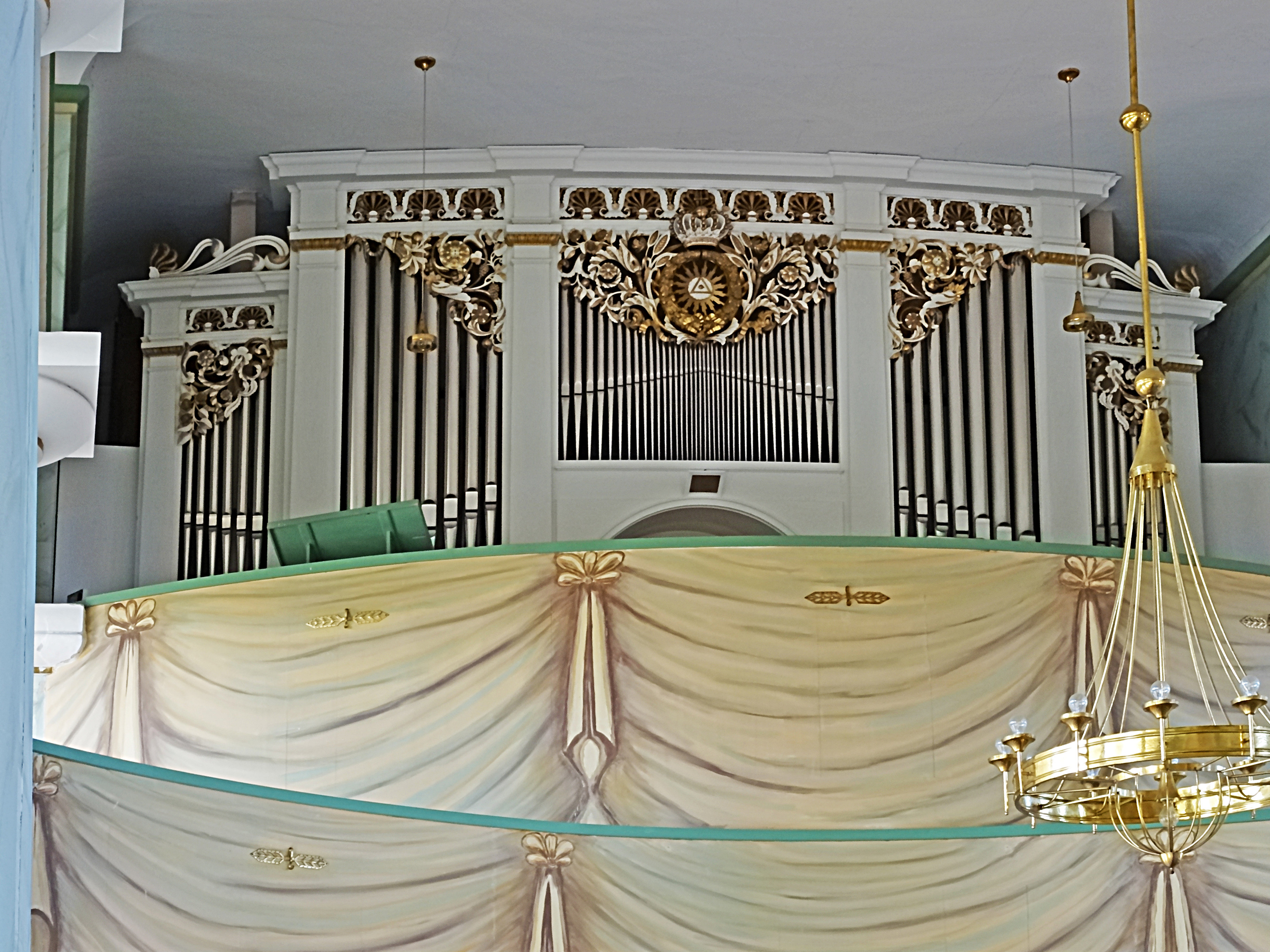
Organ in Gräfinau-Angstedt

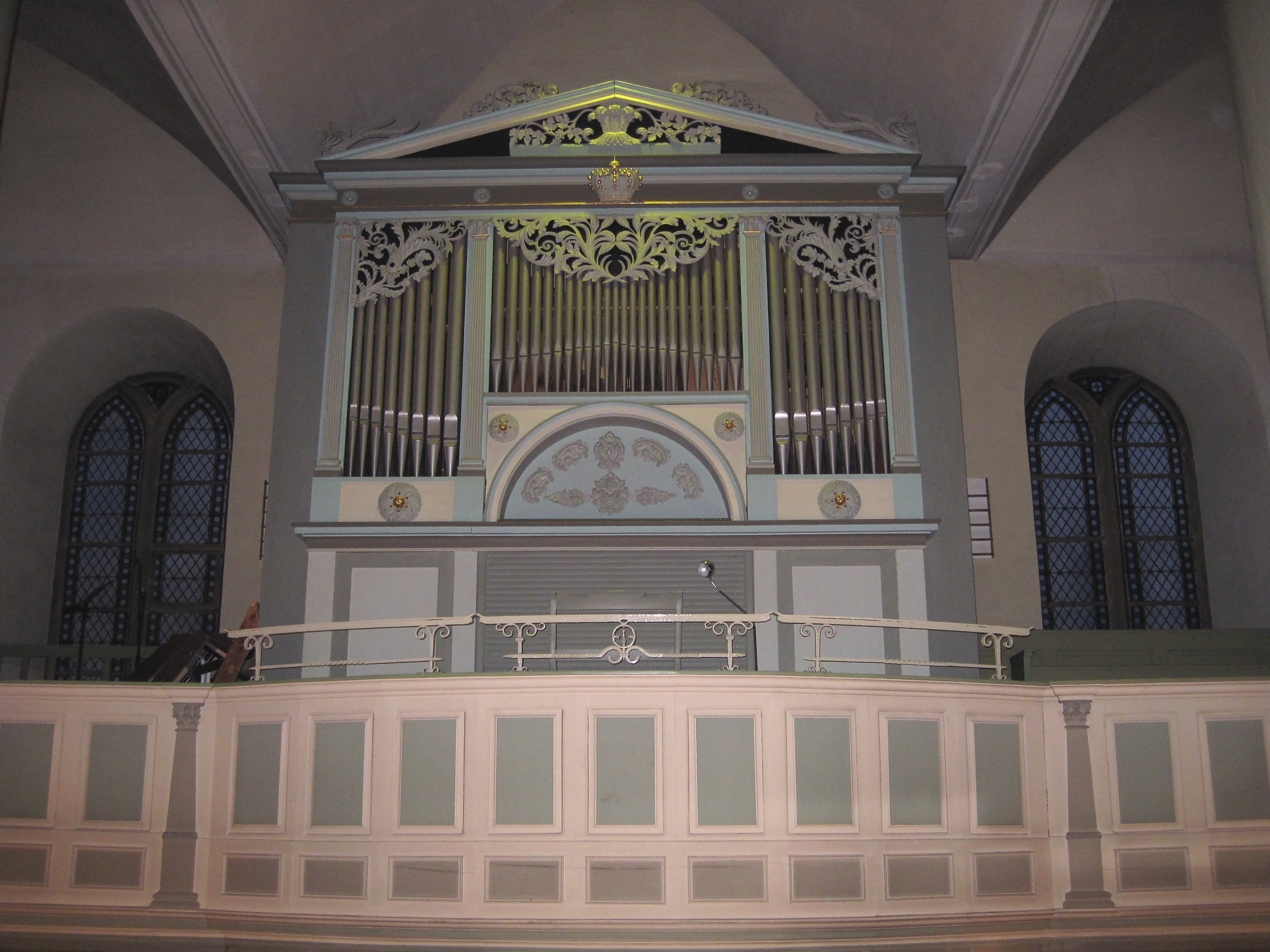
Organ in the Reformed Church in Iserlohn

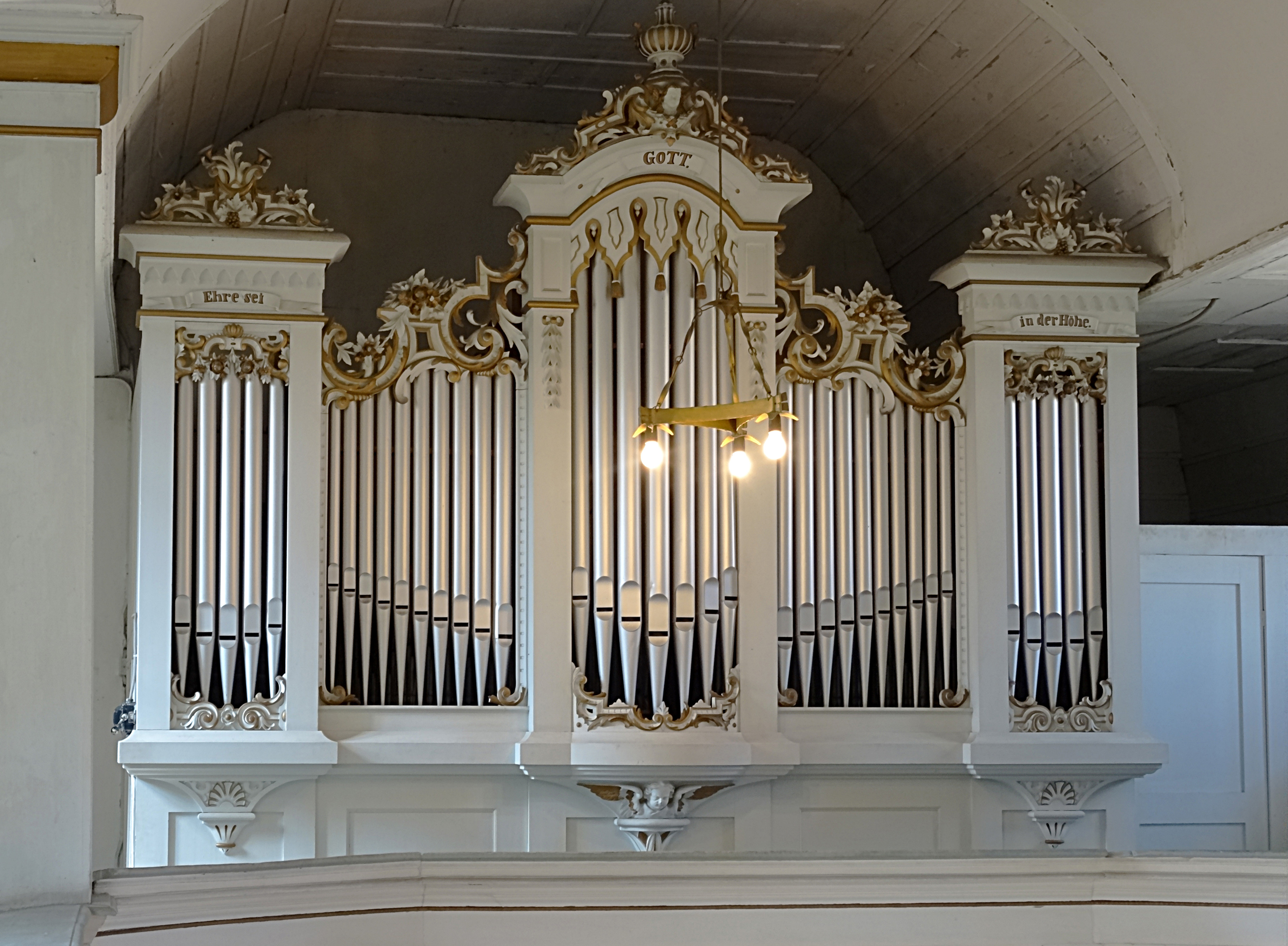
Organ in the church St. Matthias in Eischleben

More than 100 organs by Johann Friedrich Schulze are known, including:

- 1815 Dorfkirche Horba, his first work
- 1827 Stadtkirche in Rastenberg, built with Johann Gottlob Töpfer from Weimar
- 1830 Church in Gräfinau-Angstedt
- 1831 St. Martin in Heiligenstadt (replaced in 1973)
- 1843 St. Michaelis in Heringen, Thuringia
- 1845 St. Jacobi in Berlin (burnt in 1945)
- 1847 Reformed Church Iserlohn
- 1850 Bremen Cathedral
- 1851 Main organ at the Marienkirche in Lübeck (built until 1854, burnt in 1942)
- 1851 The Crystal Palace, London
- 1853 Marienkirche (Darłowo) in Rügenwalde, Pomerania
- 1857 St. Nikolai in Hausen
- 1857 Unserer lieben Frauen

Works by his sons included:

- 1868: St. Bartholomew's Church, Leeds
- 1868: St. Matthias, Eischleben
- 1869 Große Kirche Aplerbeck

== Literature ==
- Hans-Christian Tacke: Johann Gottlob Töpfer, Leben – Werk – Wirksamkeit. Kassel 2002, ISBN 3-7618-1577-8.
- Markus Vette, Rolf Bothe, Albrecht Lobenstein: Zur Restaurierung der Schulze-Orgel in der Coudray-Kirche in Rastenberg. Eugenia-Verlag, Rastenberg 2011, ISBN 978-3-938853-15-3.
- Wolfram Hackel: Die Orgelbauerfamilie Schulze. In: Einweihung der restaurierten Schulze-Orgel in der Reformierten Kirche Iserlohn. 40 Jahre Evangelische Kantorei Iserlohn. Iserlohn, 1994.
- Archiv der ev.-luth. Kirchgemeinde Königsee: Traubuch von Milbitz und Oberrottenbach: entry of 15 June 1820, seen 8 May 2017
