= Aplerbeck =

- Borough of Dortmund
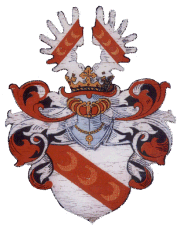
- Coat of arms

- Location within Dortmund
- Interactive map of Aplerbeck
- Location within Germany Location within North Rhine-Westphalia
- Coordinates: 51°29′30″N 07°33′20″E
- Country: Germany
- State: North Rhine-Westphalia
- City: Dortmund

Area
  - Total: 24.98 km^{2} (9.64 sq mi)
- Elevation: 150 m (490 ft)

Population (2020-12-31)
  - Total: 55,588
  - Density: 2,225/km^{2} (5,764/sq mi)
- Time zone: UTC+01:00 (CET)
  - Summer (DST): UTC+02:00 (CEST)
- Postal codes: 44287
- Dialling codes: 0231

Aplerbeck (German pronunciation: [ˈaːplɐbɛk]) is a borough (Stadtbezirk) of the city of Dortmund in the Ruhr district of North Rhine-Westphalia, Germany. Since 1929, it has been a suburb of Dortmund, located in the city's south-east. The river Emscher, a tributary of the Ruhr, crosses Aplerbeck.

Aplerbeck was first documented as a village in 899. The place is associated with the death of two martyrs both named Ewald in the 7th century, according to the Golden Legend. Aplerbeck was the location of mining and heavy industry as part of the Ruhr from the 19th century to 1926, resulting in a larger population and the building of a representative town hall and a larger church. A psychiatric hospital of regional importance, founded in 1890, is still in operation, now as LWL-Klinik Dortmund.

== History ==
The first document mentioning Aplerbeck, then Afaldrabechi, is a founding document (Stiftungsurkunde) of 899, a term containing "apple" and "creek". According to the Golden Legend, two missionaries, the Two Ewalds, were killed near Aplerbeck in the 7th century.

With industrialisation, mining was done in Zeche Vereinigte Schürbank & Charlottenburg. In 1855, Aplerbeck was connected by rail of the Cologne-Minden Railway Company. The Aplerbecker Hütte was founded in 1862.

In 1890, the Prussian state government chose Aplerbeck as the home of a new psychiatric clinic to serve the Ruhr area. A former farm was acquired, to employ the patients in agriculture. Named Westfälische Provinzial-Heilanstalt Aplerbeck (later short: Westfälische Klinik and Heilanstalt) in 1904, it was meant to house 660 patients.

The town hall of Aplerbeck, Amtshaus Aplerbeck, was built in 1906/07 by Wilhelm Stricker. The Aplerbecker Hütte was closed in 1925. Aplerbeck became part of Dortmund on 1 August 1929.

During the reign of the Nazis, Jewish citizens were deported, only 30 of 120 in 1933 could emigrate. Around 340 patients of the psychiatric clinic were sterilised. In 1941, 95 patients were moved to Hadamar and killed.

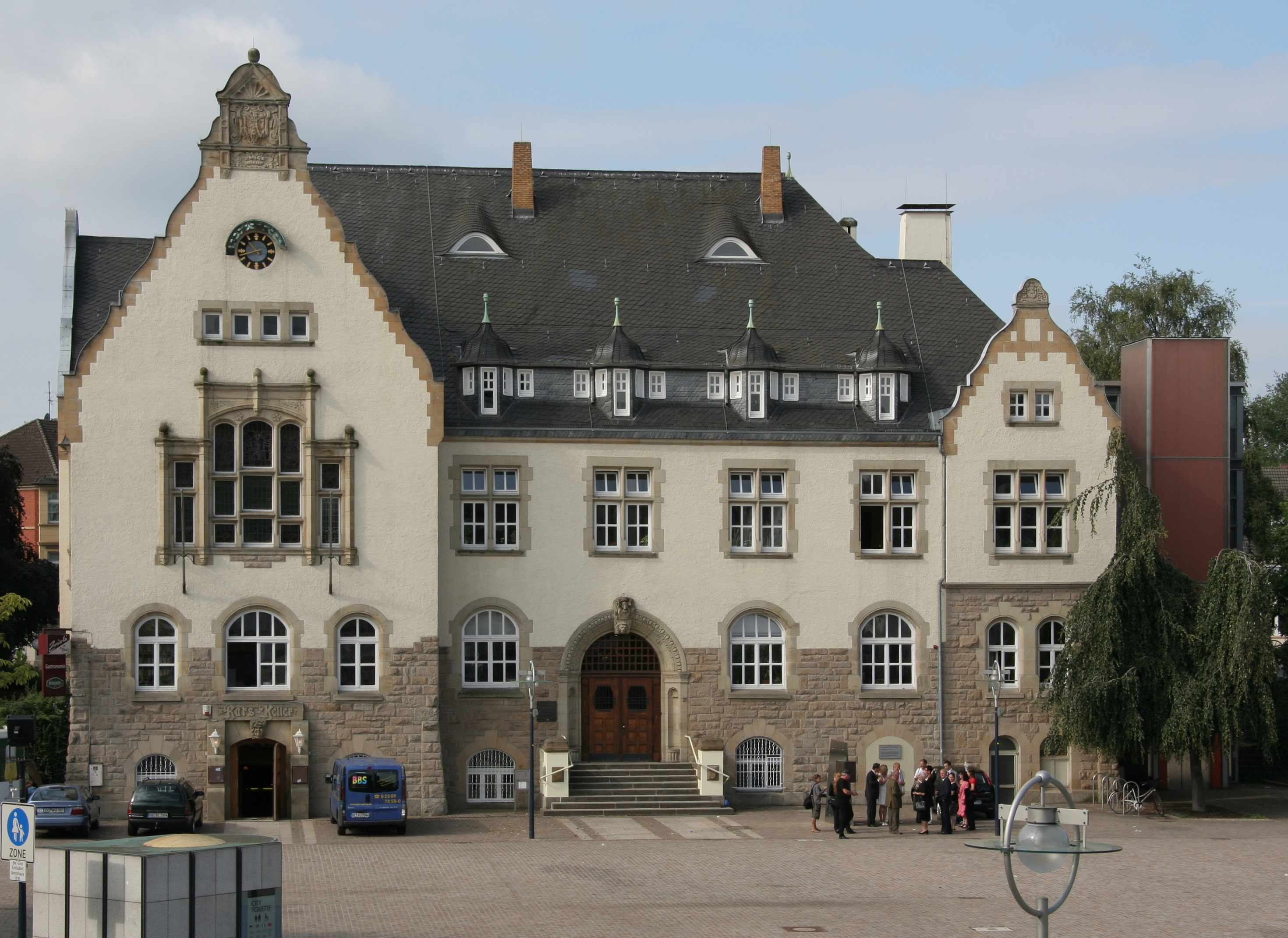
City hall

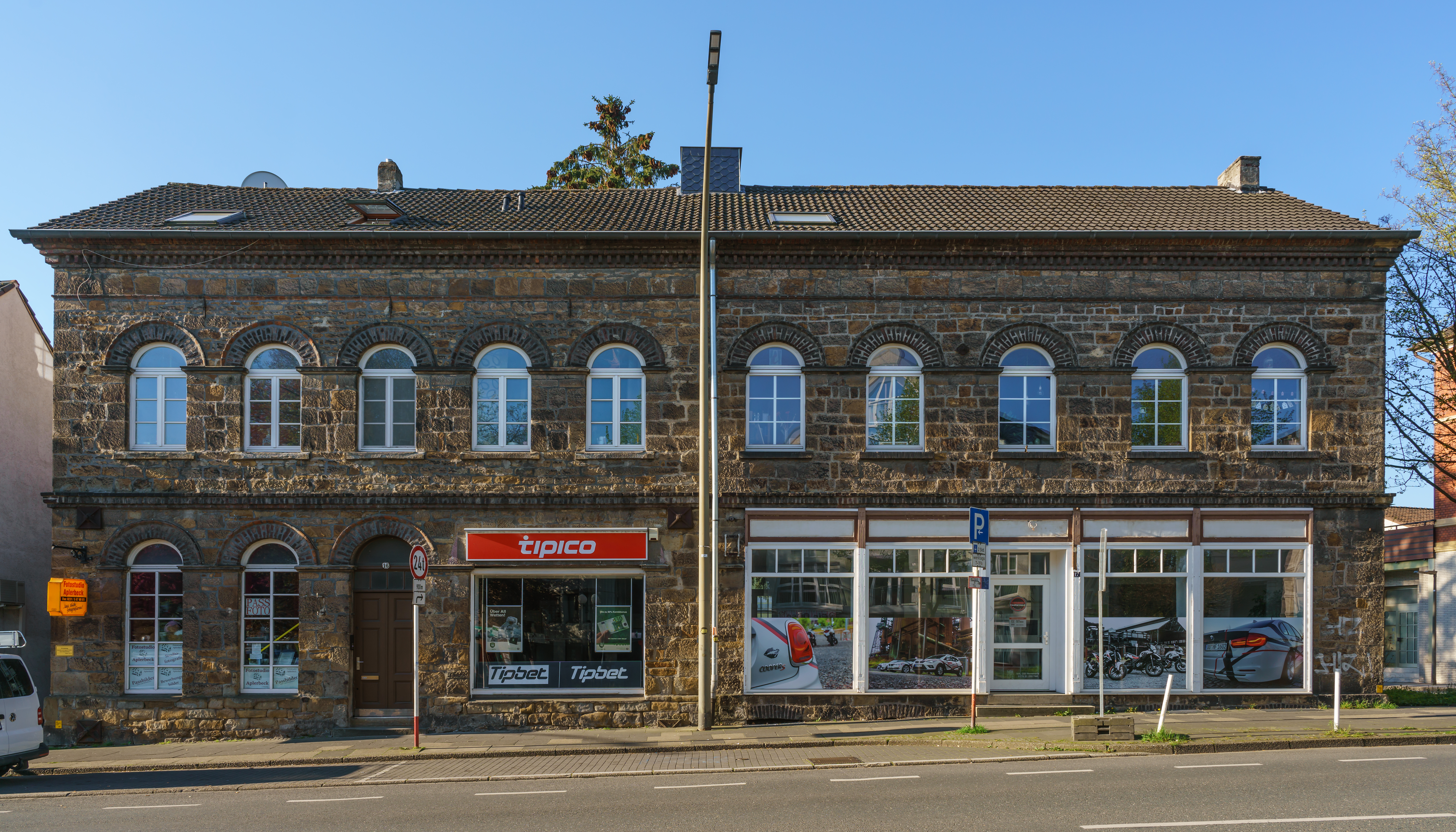
The Altes Amtshaus (old communal town hall and historical jail), April 2019

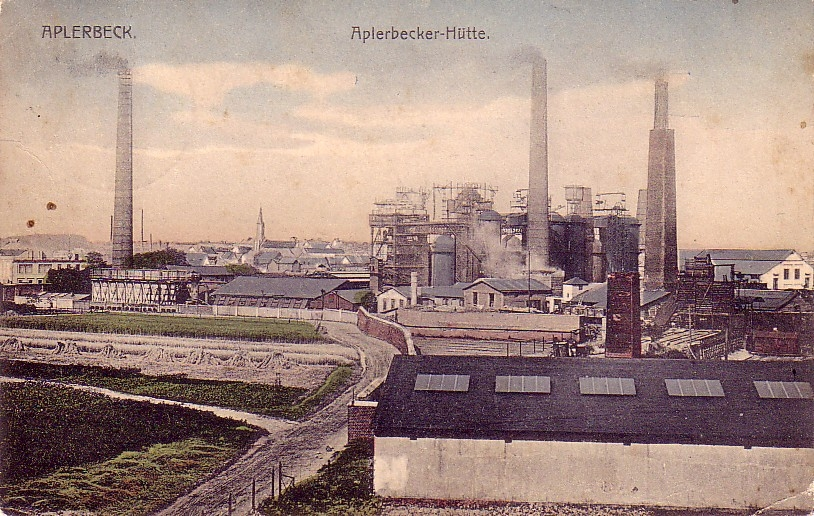
Aplerbecker Hütte on a postcard, c. 1910

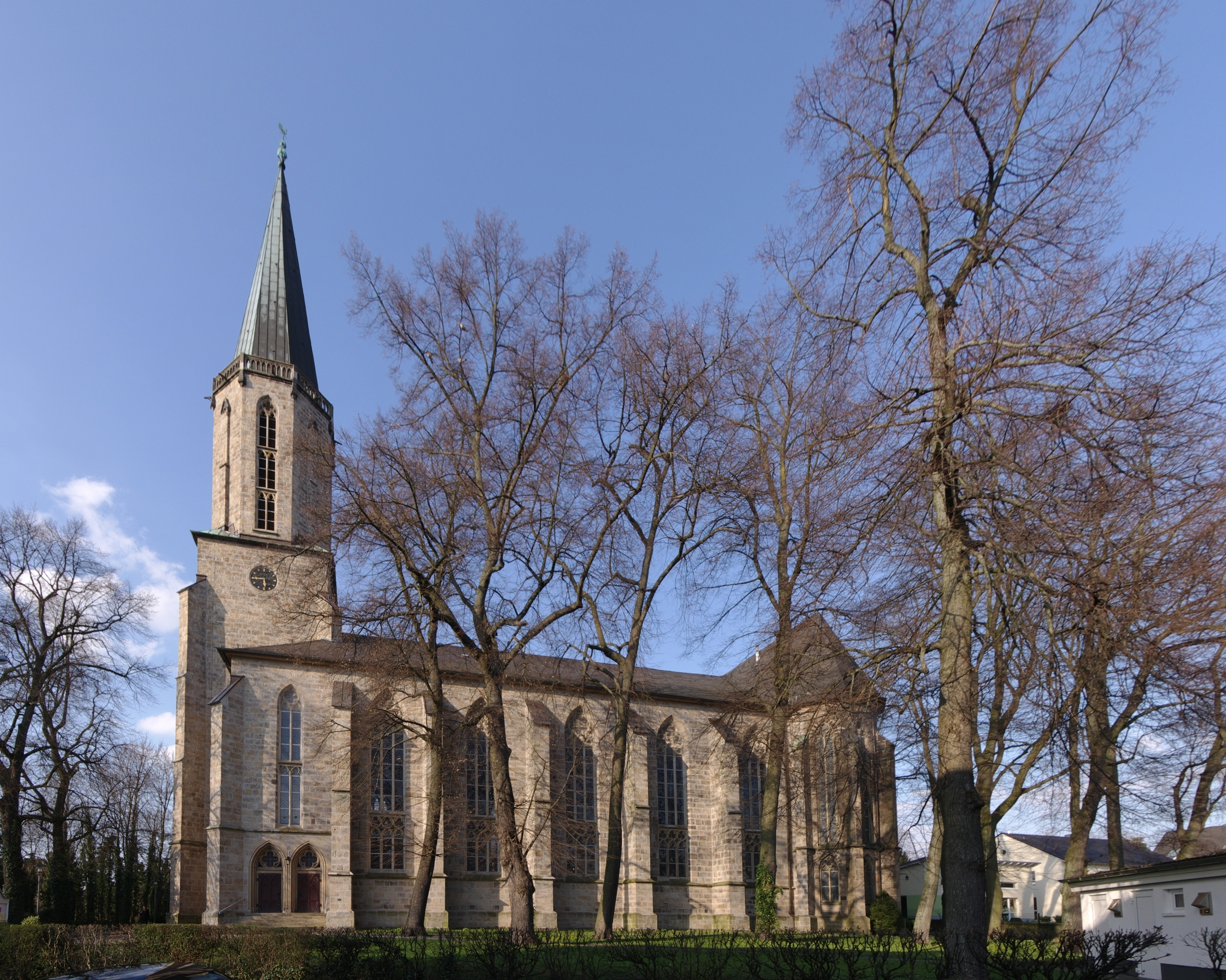
Große Kirche

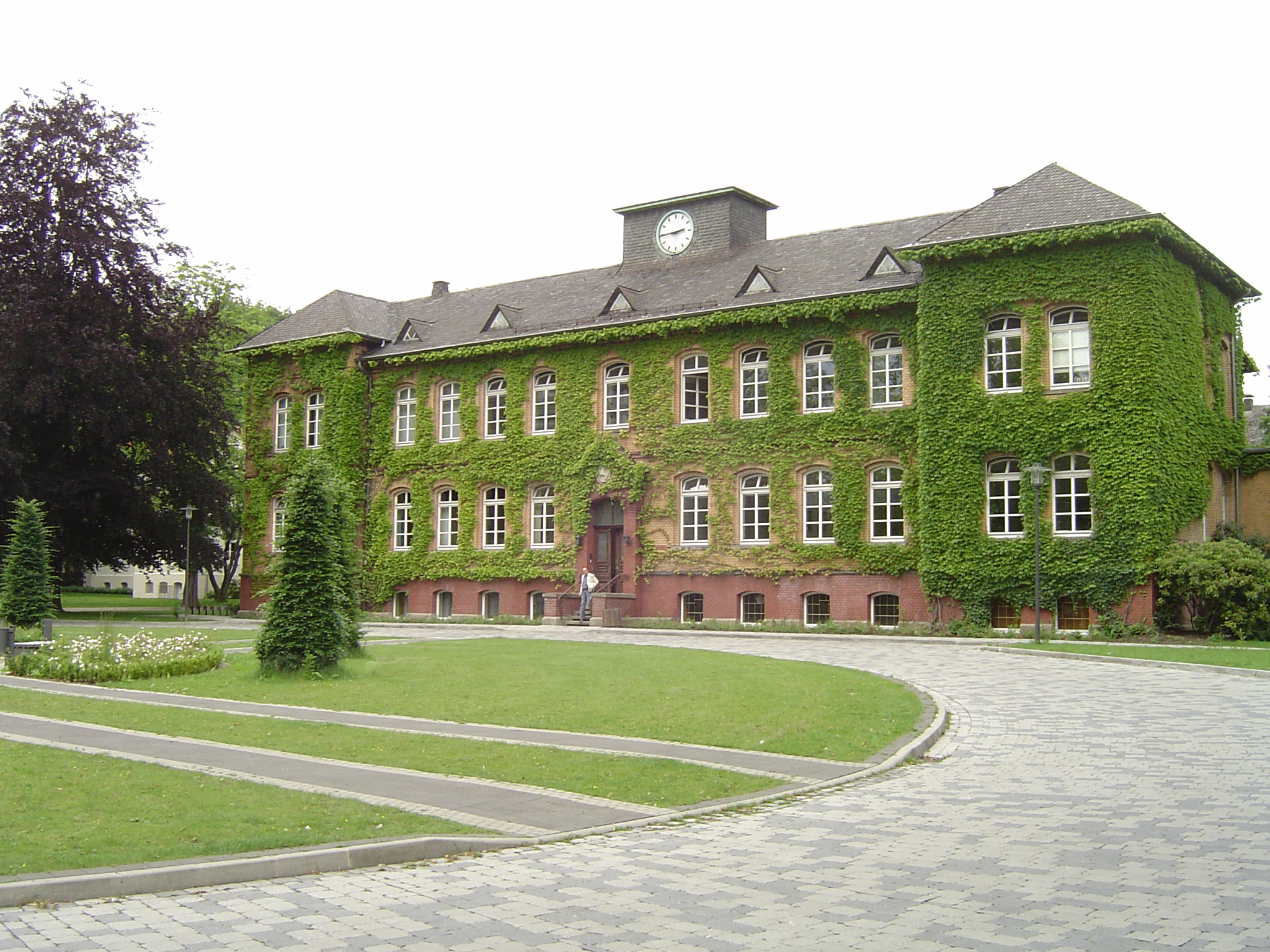
Westfälische Klinik, main building in 2007

== Religion ==
The Georgskirche is a Romanesque church which is first mentioned in a document in 1147, but probably is based on an older building from the 9th century. The Reformation reached Aplerbeck in 1570. With the industrialisation, a larger church was needed. The Große Kirche Aplerbeck was built in Gothic Revival style after a design by Christian Heyden from 1867 to 1869. The Georgskirche was no longer used and deteriorated. It was restored in 1963, and is now the main location for Protestant services, while the larger church is often used for concerts.

As many people of Polish origin settled in Aplerbeck, they needed a Catholic church, which was built after a design by August Carl Lange and consecrated on 21 December 1880, named St. Ewaldi after the martyrs. After World War II, this church became too small for a growing congregation. It was replaced in 1971 by a new church.

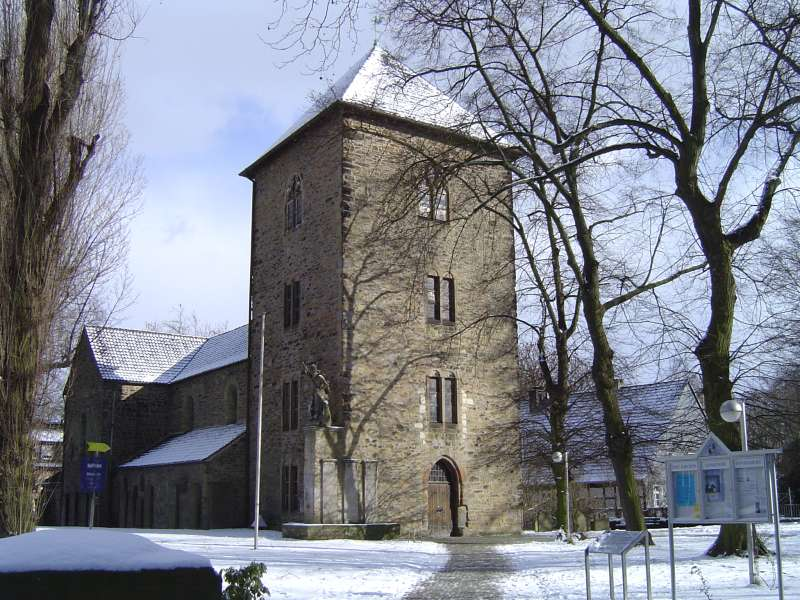
Georgskirche

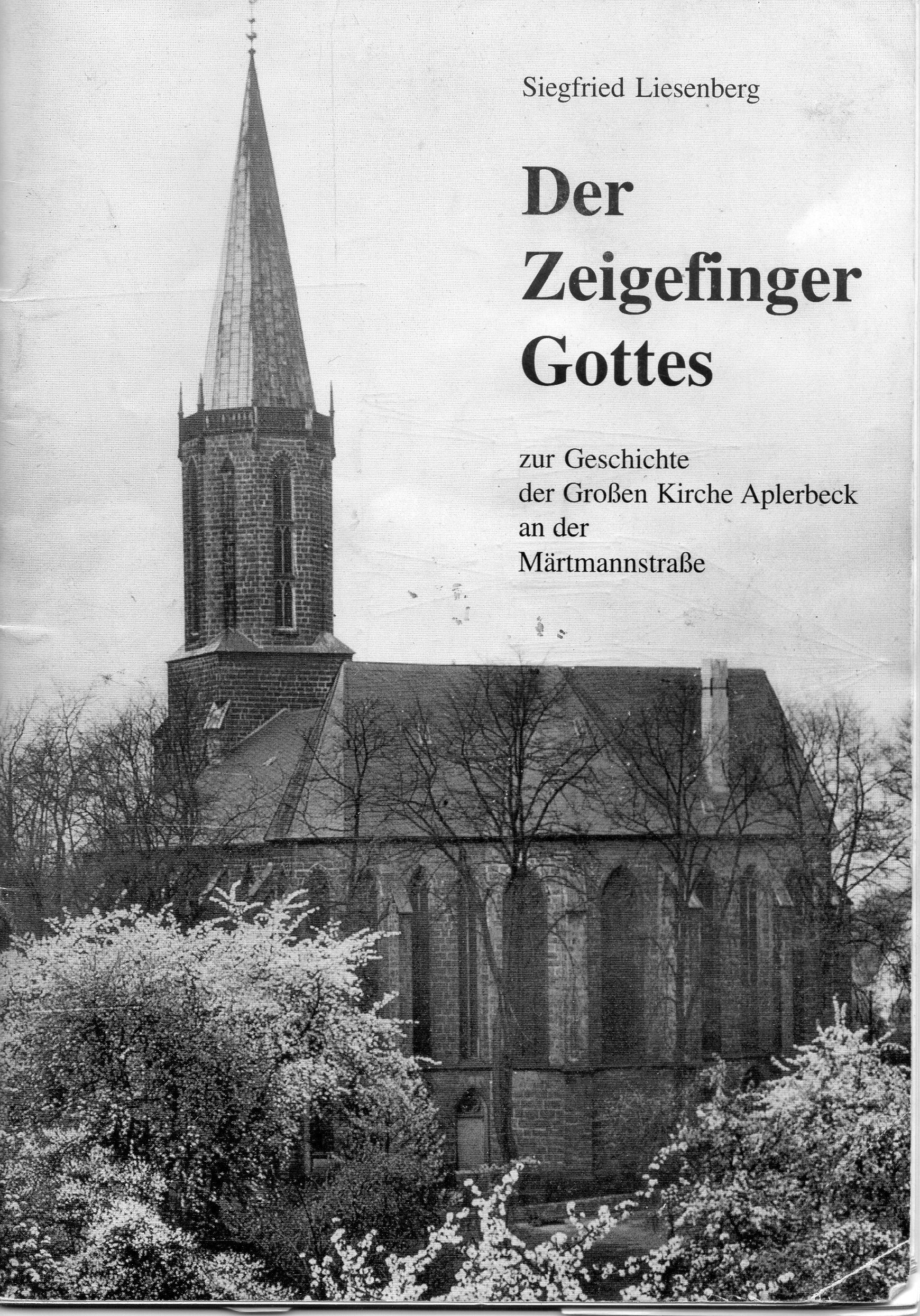
Der Zeigefinger Gottes (God's index finger)

== Personalities ==
- Wilhelm Canaris (1887–1945), Admiral
- Paul Graebner (1871–1933), botanist
- Heinz Eberhard Strüning (1896–1986), painter, artist

== Literature ==
- Siegfried Niehaus: Aplerbeck. Heinrich Borgmann, Dortmund 1977.
- Siegfried Niehaus: Kleine Geschichte des Amtes Aplerbeck. Stadtsparkasse Dortmund, 1980.
- Uwe Bitzel: Lebensunwert. Die Heilanstalt Aplerbeck und ihre Kranken während des Nationalsozialismus. Montania, Dortmund 1995, ISBN 3-929236-04-4.
- Hans Georg Kirchhoff, Siegfried Liesenberg (ed.): 1100 Jahre Aplerbeck: Festschrift im Auftrag des Vereins für Heimatpflege. Essen 1998, ISBN 3-88474-735-5.
- Georg Eggenstein (ed.): Aplerbeck. Sechs Profile – Ein Gesicht. Limosa, Clenze 2010, ISBN 978-3-86037-402-3.
