= Gerhard Eichhorn =

German painter and designer (1927–2015)

Gerhard Eichhorn (3 May 1927 – 15 December 2015) was a German graphic artist, painter and draughtsman.

== Life ==
Born in Judenbach, Eichhorn attended the Fachschule für angewandte Kunst in Sonneberg in 1942/43 and from 1945 to 1947, graduating as a ceramic modeller. From 1950 to 1955, he studied graphic design at the Hochschule für Grafik und Buchkunst Leipzig under Elisabeth Voigt, Heinz Eberhard Strüning and Heinz Wagner. He completed an Aspirantur with Hans Mayer-Foreyt from 1955 to 1958, at the same time leading the evening class in nude drawing. From 1959 to 1964, he was a teacher at the Leipzig College of Applied Arts, and from 1966 to 1992, he was a lecturer at the Leipzig College of Graphic Arts and Book Art, as well as head of the workshop for etchings and copperplate engraving. From 1968, he was also head of the painting and graphic arts department. From 1976, he was vice-rector and from 1978, associate professor of this teaching institution. From 1964 to 1970, he was chairman of the Bezirk Leipzig of the Verband Bildender Künstler der DDR and a member of the same from 1955 to 1990.

Eichorn died at the age of 88.

== Work ==
In 1965, he designed the bar of the Hotel Deutschland in Leipzig with a mural. Influenced by Käthe Kollwitz, he created the graphic cycles: "From the Struggle of the Working Class" and "The German Peasant War".

== Honours ==
- 1969 Verdienstmedaille der DDR
- 1987 Vaterländischer Verdienstorden in Silver

== Exhibitions ==
=== Personal exhibition ===
- 1975 Brandenburg
- 1976, 1977 and 1979 Leipzig
- also in Kiev, Krakow, Lyon, Moscow, Parma, Tallinn, Vienna.

=== Exhibition participations ===
- 1958, 1962, 1967, 1972 and 1977 Kunstausstellung der DDR
- since 1955 District Art Exhibition Leipzig
