= St. Georg, Aplerbeck =

St. Georg
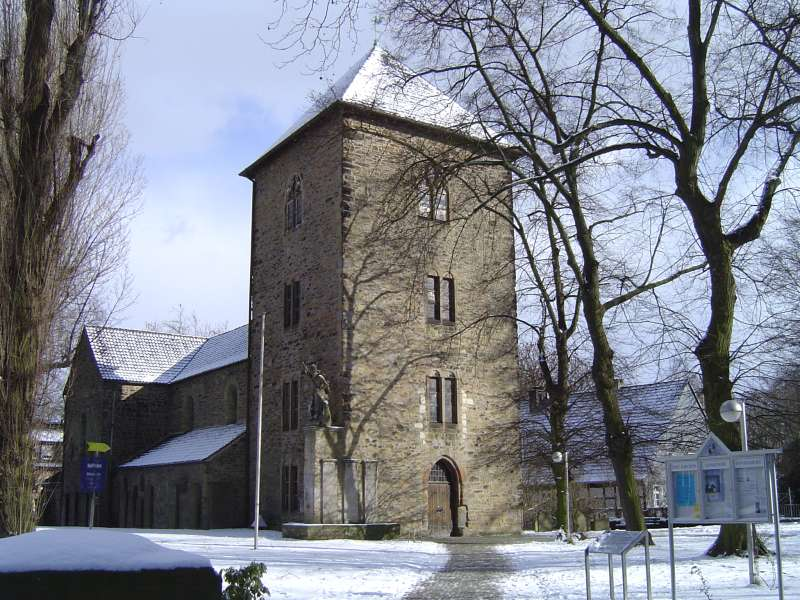
- Georgskirche

- 51°29′37″N 07°33′42″E
- Location: Aplerbeck, North Rhine-Westphalia
- Country: Germany
- Denomination: Protestant
- Website: www.georgsgemeinde.de

Architecture
- Architectural type: Cross basilica
- Style: Romanesque
- Completed: ca. 1150

Administration
- Parish: Evangelische Georgs-Kirchengemeinde Dortmund

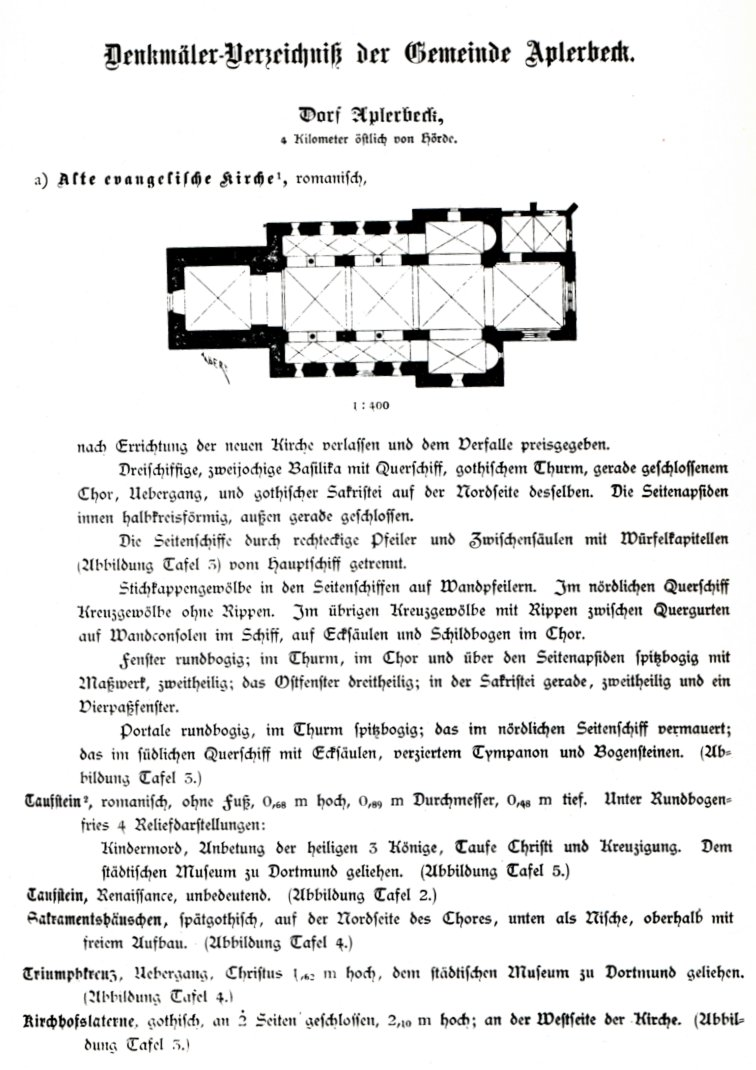
Floor plan, Ludorff 1894

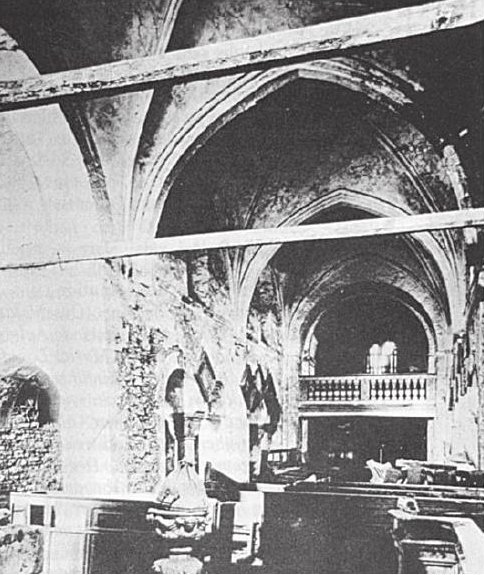
Interior in the 19th century

St. Georg is a church and Protestant parish in Aplerbeck, now part of Dortmund, North Rhine-Westphalia, Germany. It is a Romanesque cross basilica (Kreuzbasilika) from the 12th century. The only building in Dortmund of its kind, it is a listed monument.

In the 19th century when the town grew due to industrialisation, a larger church was built, and St. Georg fell into disrepair. It served as a community hall from 1926, and was restored as a church from 1963. It is again the parish church, while the larger church has been mostly used for concerts since 1999.

== History ==
A church in Aplerbeck was first mentioned in a document of 899. Remnants of an early church were found when the present building was restored in 1963. The present Georgskirche is dated between 1150 and 1160.

The church became Lutheran with the Confessio Augustana of 1612. Due to industrialisation in the 19th century, a new church was built in Aplerbeck, which was later called Große Kirche Aplerbeck, dedicated in 1869. The Georgskirche fell into disrepair. It was struck by lightning in 1872, but not restored. In 1894, a plan to demolish the ruin was not supported by the Prussian government. The street on which it was located was eventually named Ruinenstraße (ruin street) because of the condition of the church.

The church was a ruin until 1926. A plan to make it the centre of a community hall with a restaurant, or a museum, was declined by the conservator (Landeskonservator) Johannes Körner, who demanded that the Romanesque building should be restored without alterations. He could not prevent the building of a war memorial with a sculpture of Michael the archangel next to the steeple, which led to the name "Michaelisbau".

The church was used as a hall for Nazi assemblies, and also after World War II. In 1963 finally, the church was restored to its former appearance and was called Georgskirche again. It serves as the main parish church, after declining attendance failed to fill the Große Kirche for regular services.

== Literature ==
- Siegfried Liesenberg (1992), Die Georgskirche in Aplerbeck (in German), Dortmund-Aplerbeck: Gustav Kleff
