= Christian Heyden =

German architect

- Baptized: 14 August 1803
- Died: 4 November 1869 (aged 66)
- Occupation: Architect
- Awards: Order of the Red Eagle

Christian Heyden (baptised 14 August 1803, died 4 November 1869) was a German architect. He is known for Gothic Revival buildings, especially churches, in Westphalia, Germany.

== Career ==
Heyden was the son of the Baumeister Johann Christian Heyden the elder. He was baptised on 14 August 1803 in Freckhausen. Heyden was from 1843 member of the board of the Barmer section of the Central Cathedral Building Society. He was a member of the Elberfeld Masonic lodge Hermann zum Lande der Berge and in 1863 was awarded the Prussian Order of the Red Eagle.

Heyden has been regarded as a leading figure for Gothic Revival buildings in Westphalia. He often collaborated with Gerhard August Fischer. He created the Martin-Luther-Kirche in Gütersloh, the Große Kirche in Aplerbeck, the Wichlinghauser Kirche near Barmen, the Protestant church in Haßlinghausen, the Christuskirche in Königswinter, the tower of the Süsterkirche in Bielefeld, the Protestant church in Radevormwald and the Christuskirche in Werdohl. Heyden has been regarded as a leading figure for Gothic Revival buildings in Westphalia. He often collaborated with Gerhard August Fischer. He created the Martin-Luther-Kirche in Gütersloh, the Große Kirche in Aplerbeck, the Wichlinghauser Kirche near Barmen, the Protestant church in Haßlinghausen, the Christuskirche in Königswinter, the tower of the Süsterkirche in Bielefeld, the Protestant church in Radevormwald and the Christuskirche in Werdohl. He built in Gütersloh also the town hall which was demolished in 1970., the Protestant hospital (demolished in 1968), and the Avenstroths Mühle, a listed monument.

Heyden took part in buildings of Gasanstalten, including Barmen, Gütersloh and Dorsten.

== Gallery ==
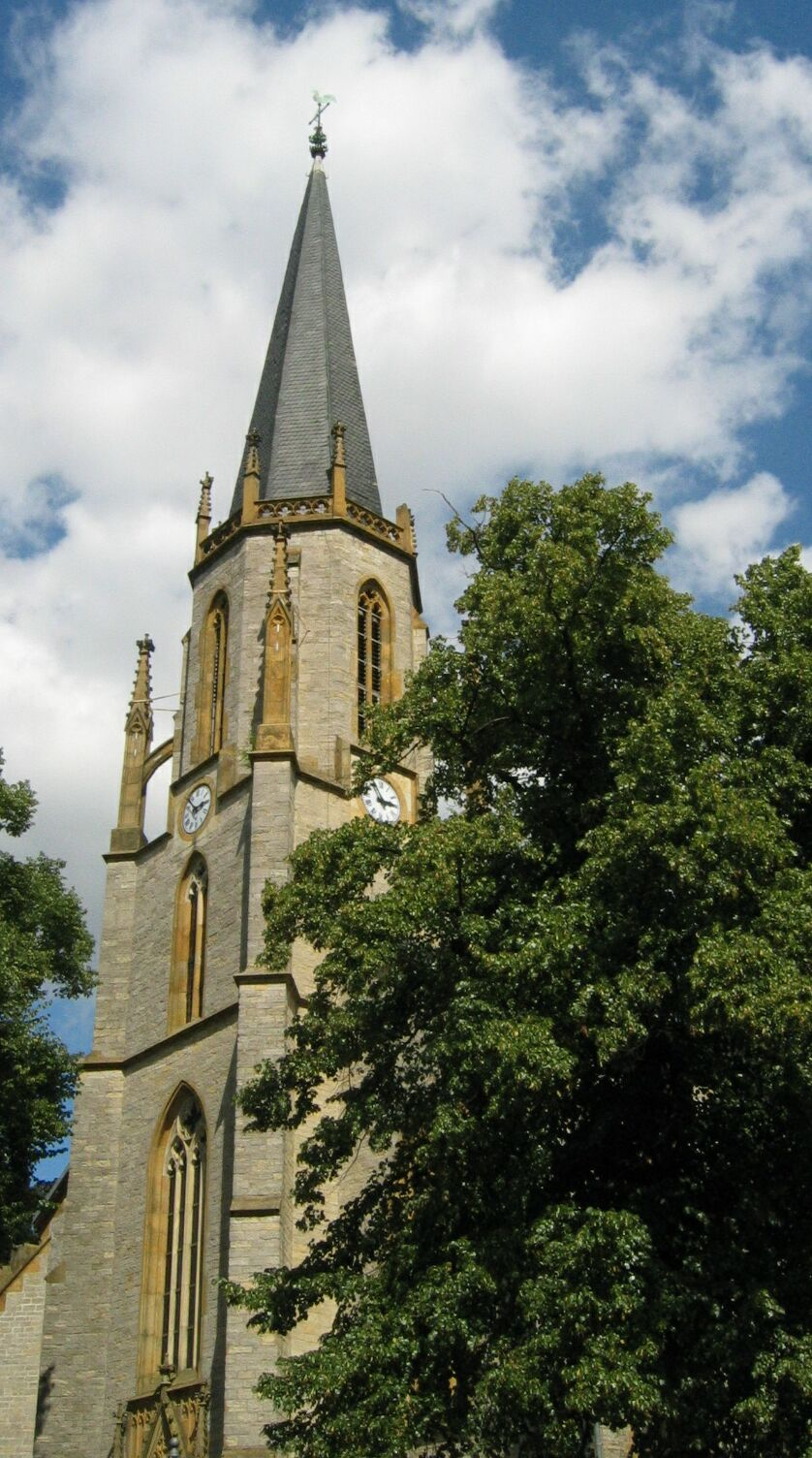
Martin-Luther-Kirche in Gütersloh, 1861

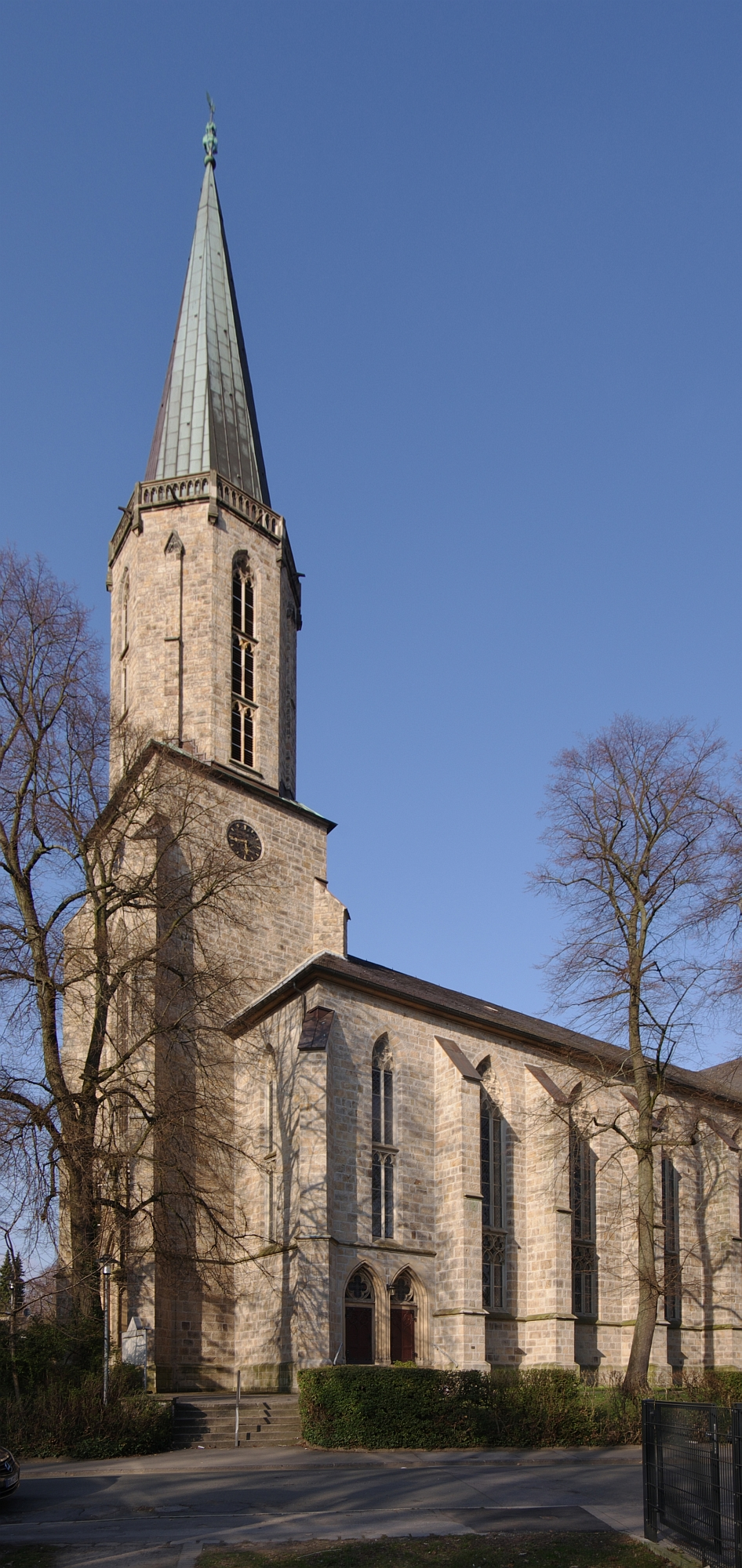
Große Kirche in Aplerbeck, 1867–1869

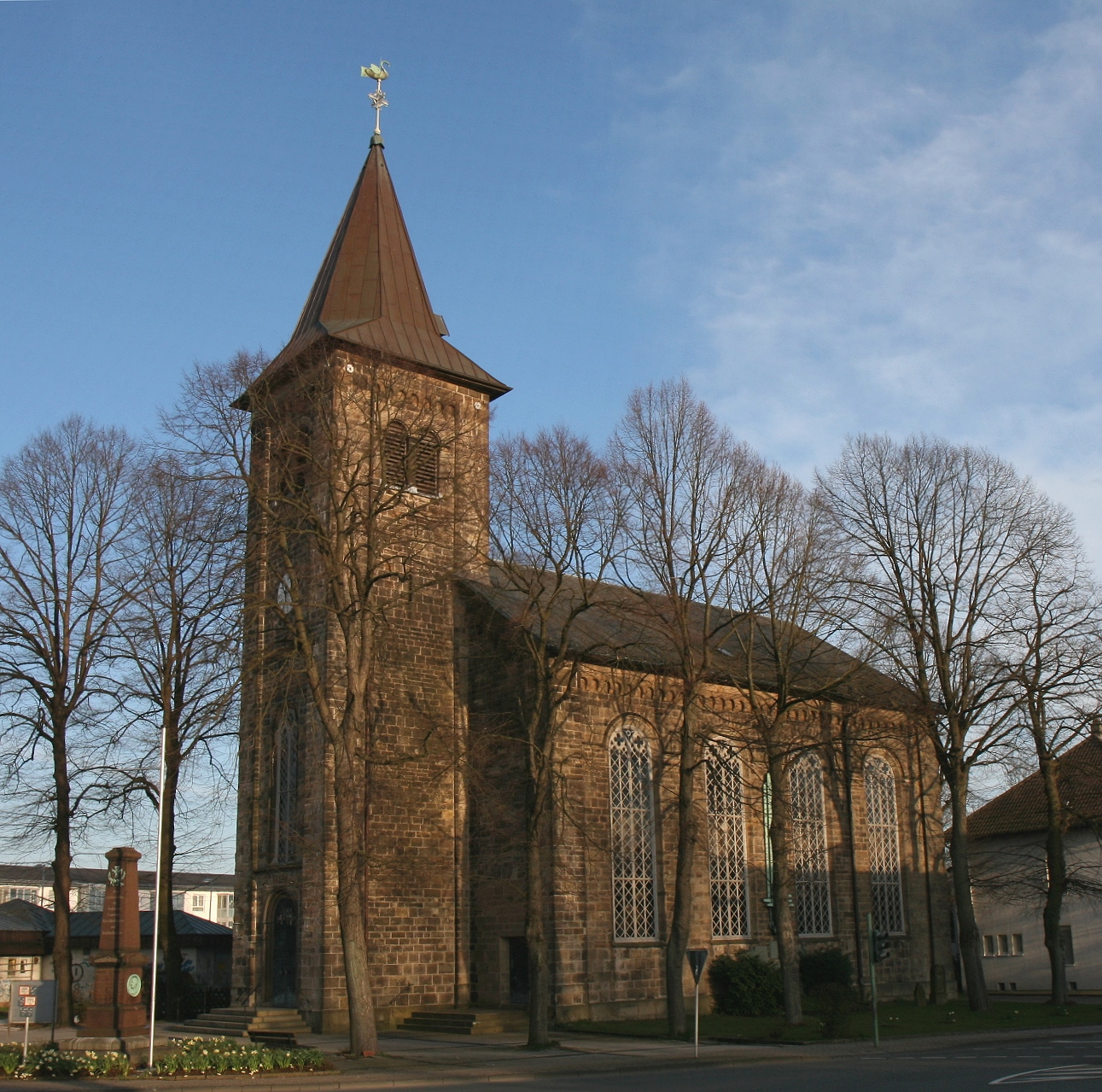
Hasslinghausener Kirche in Hasslinghausen, 1853–1854

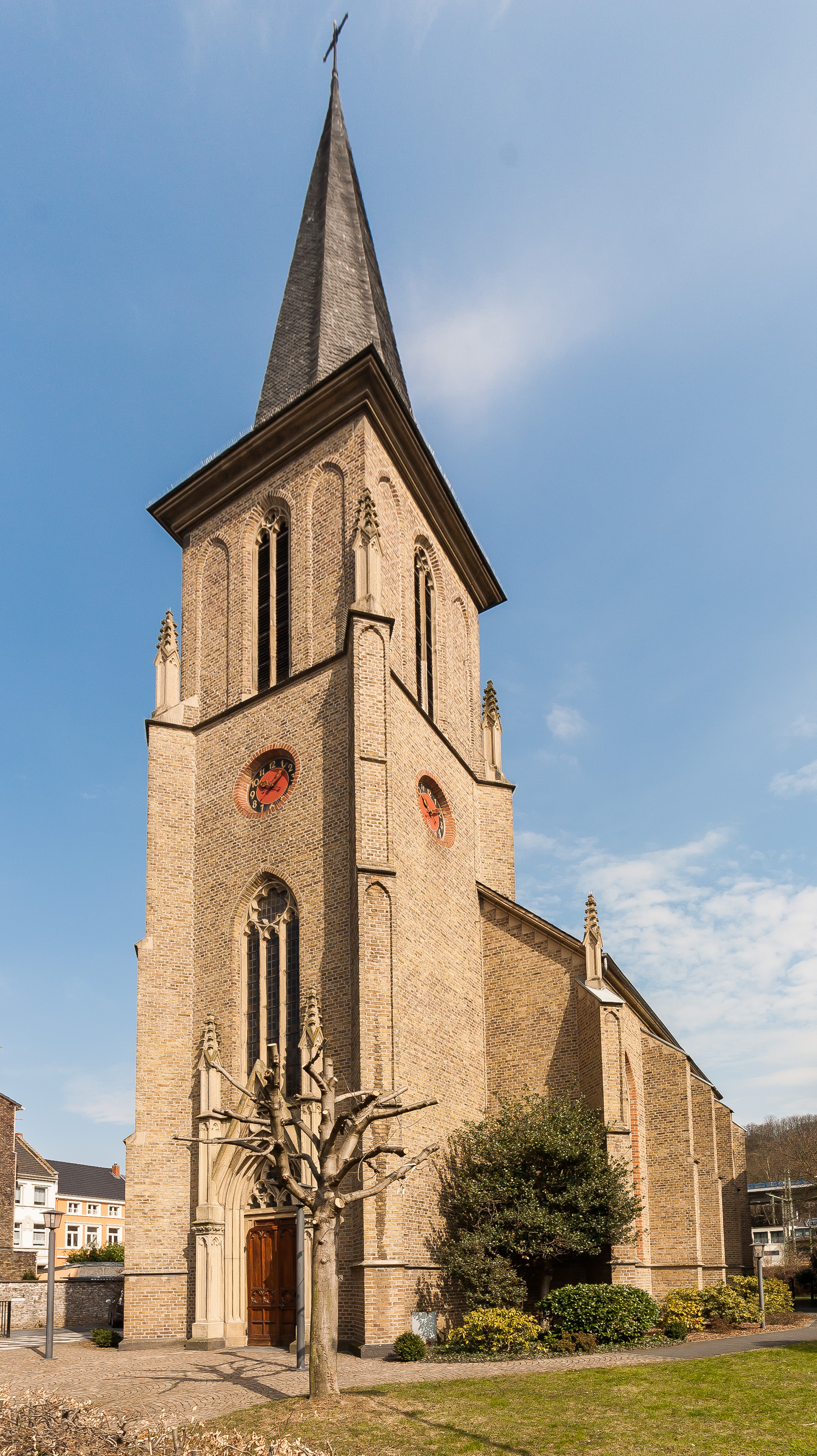
Christuskirche in Königswinter, 1863–1864

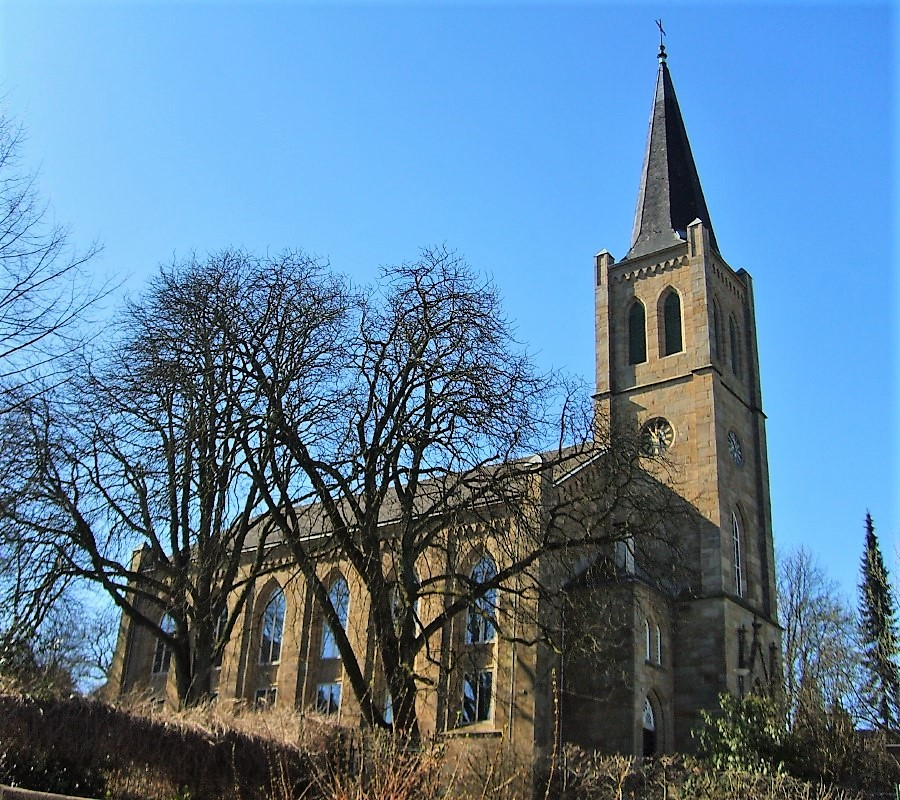
Wichlinghauser Kirche in Wuppertal, 1867

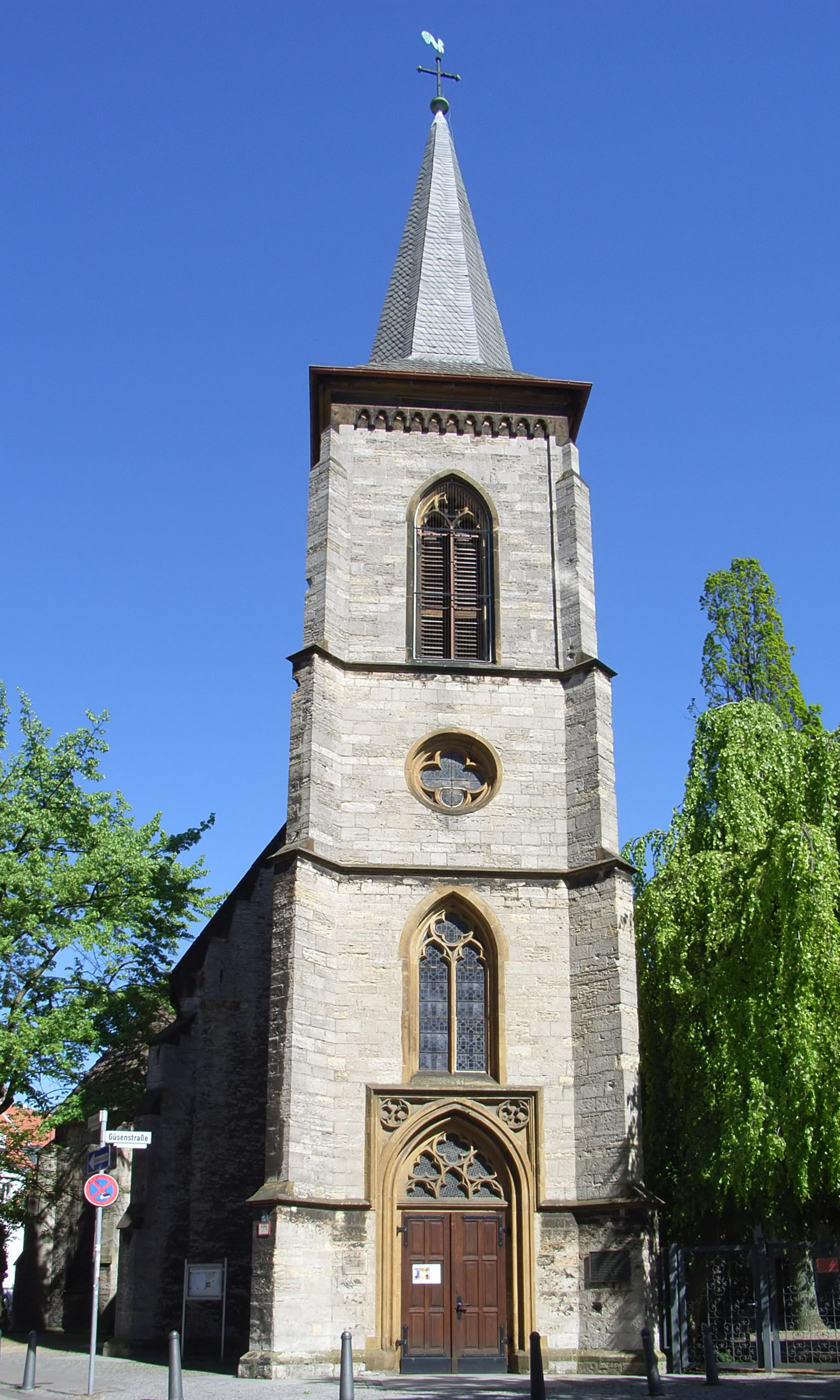
Süsterkirche in Bielefeld (steeple by Heyden), 1861

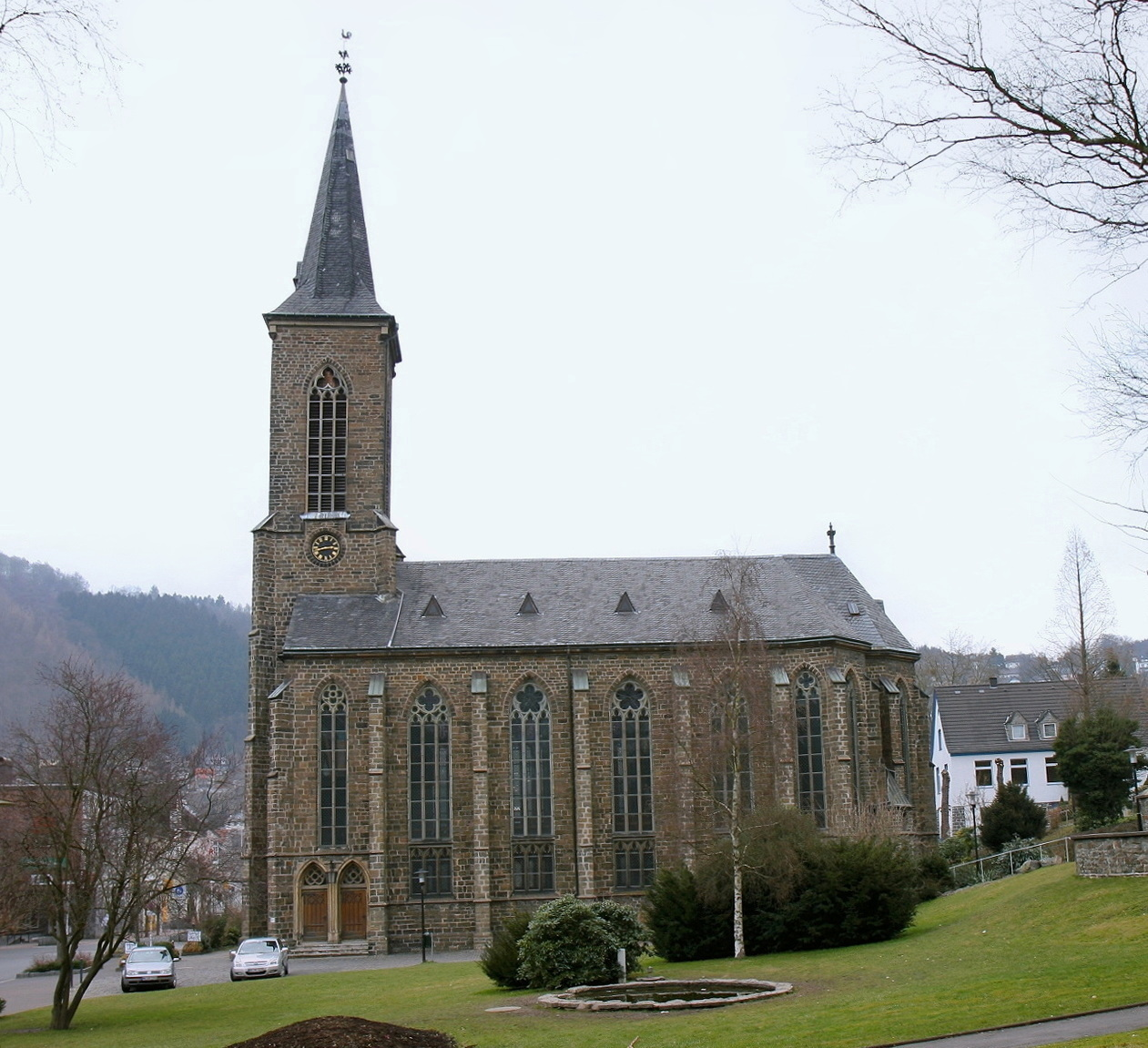
Christuskirche in Werdohl, 1866–1868

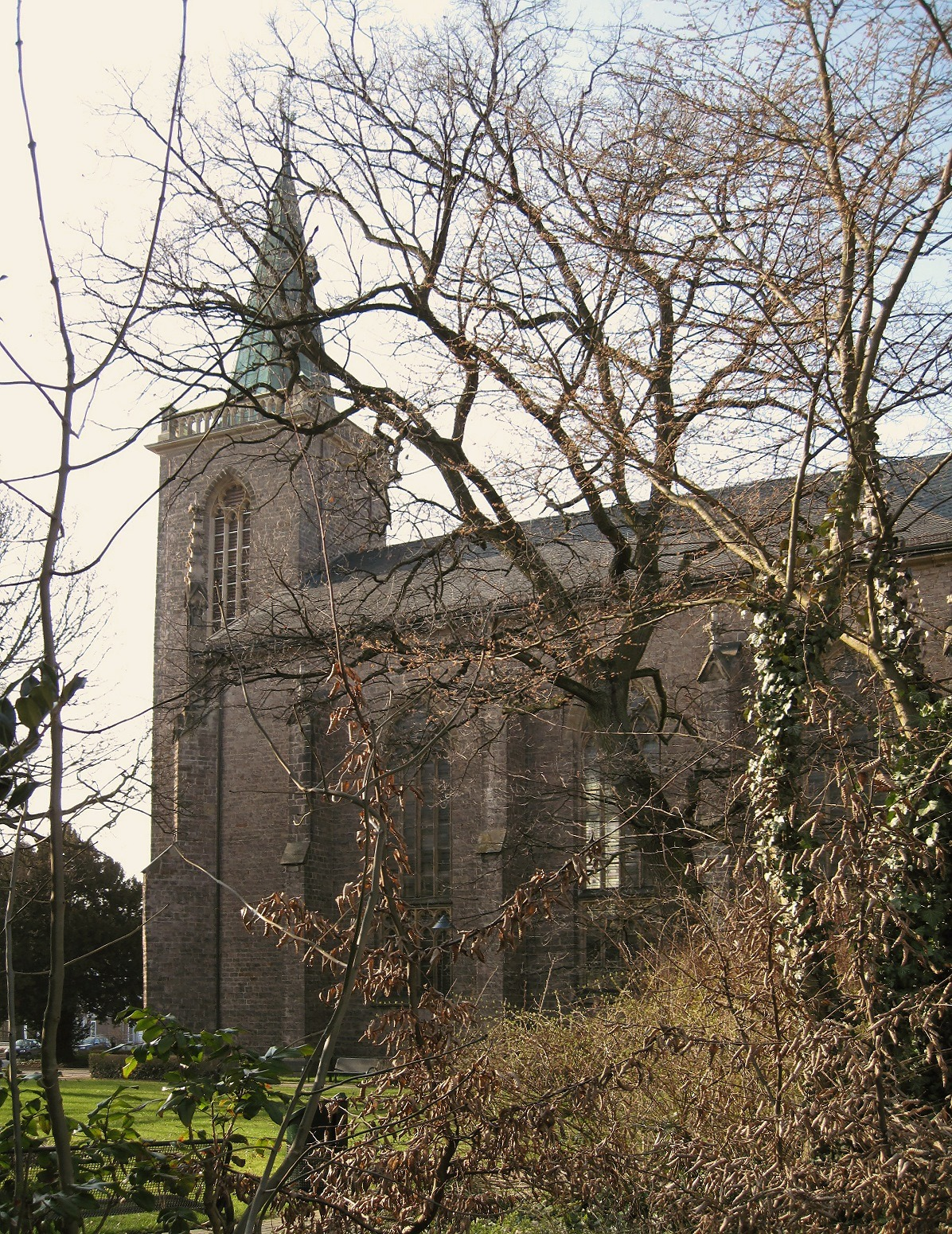
Heilig-Geist-Kirche in Menden, 1861–1864
