= History of religion in the Netherlands =

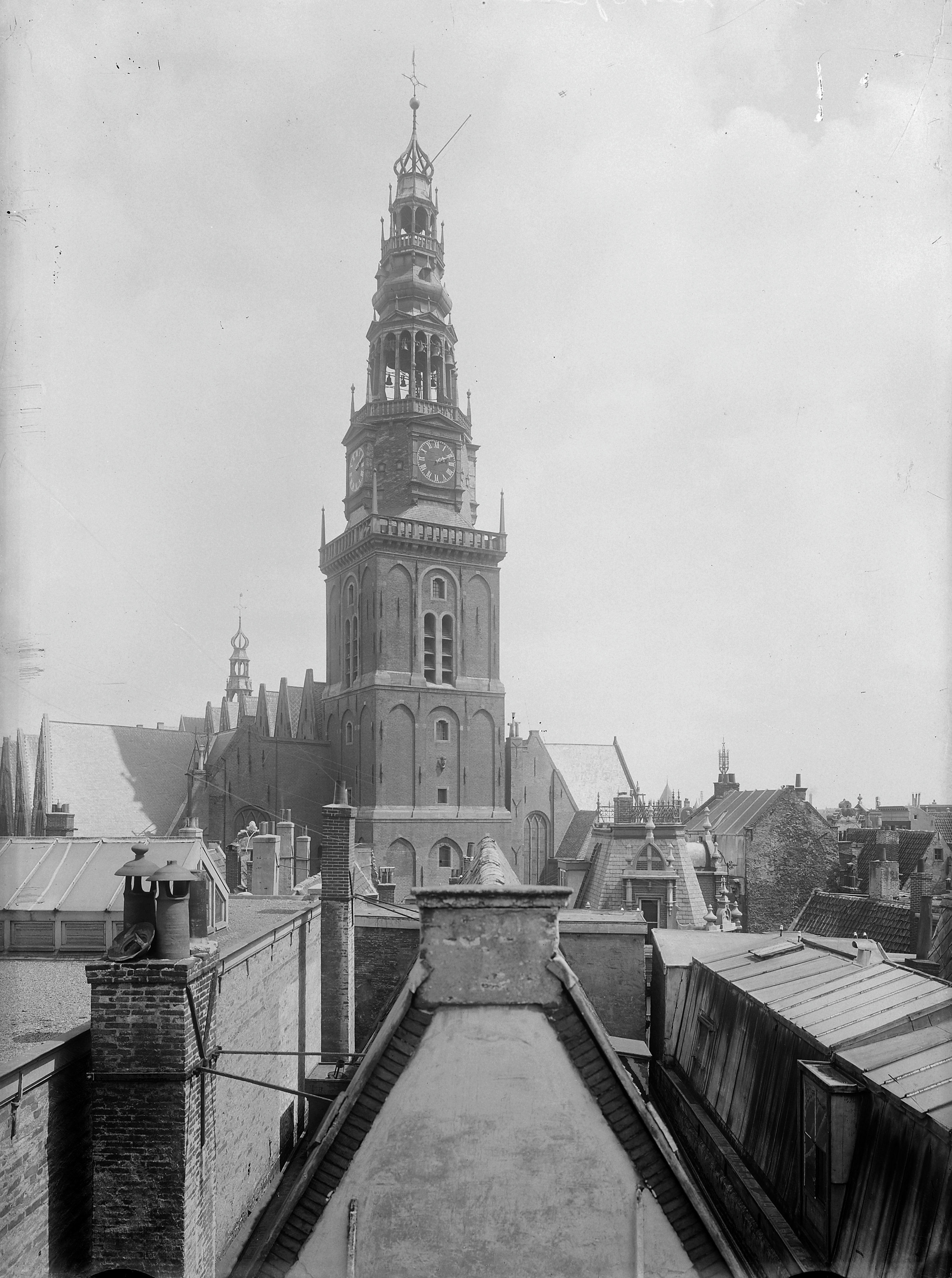
The Oude Kerk in Amsterdam

The history of religion in the Netherlands has been characterized by considerable diversity of religious thought and practice. From 1600 until the second half of the 20th century, the north and west had embraced the Protestant Reformation and were Calvinist. The southeast was predominately Catholic. Associated with immigration from Arab world (North Africa and the Middle east) of the 20th century, Muslims and other minority religions were concentrated in ethnic neighborhoods in the cities.

Since the 1960s, the Netherlands has become one of the most secular countries in the Western world. In a December 2014 survey by VU Amsterdam, more atheists (25%) were reported than theists (17%) for the first time in the history of the Netherlands. The majority of the remainder of the population identified as agnostic (31%) or ietsist (27%).

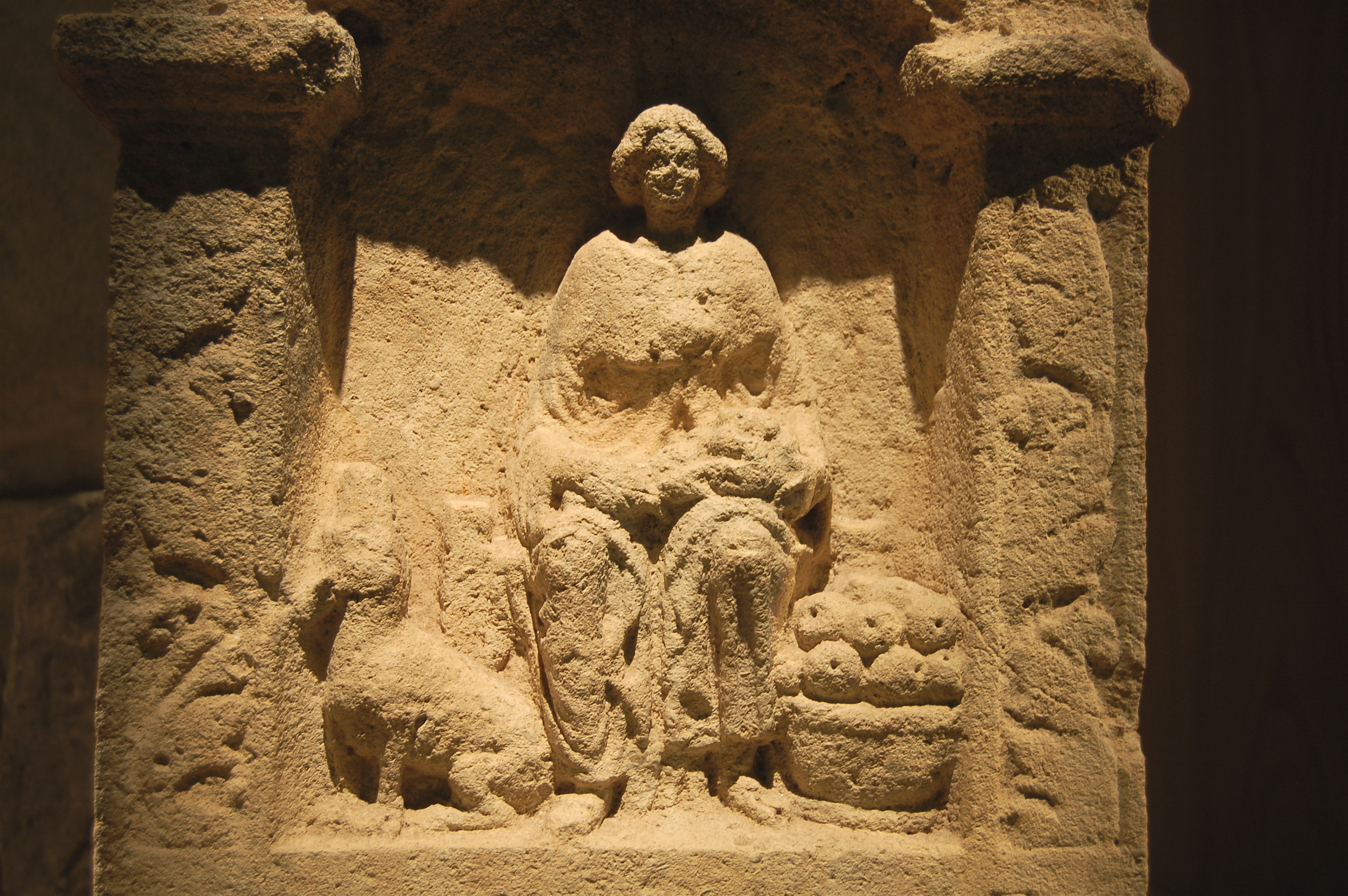
Altar for Nehalennia AD 150–250

== Prehistory and Early Middle Ages ==
Before the advent of Christianity, the Netherlands were populated by Celtic tribes in the South, which adhered to Celtic polytheism, and Germanic tribes in the North, which adhered to Germanic paganism. After the Roman Empire occupied the later southern Netherlands, Roman mythology became important there, as well as religions from the Middle East, including relics from Egyptian mythology, Judaism, Mithraism and later Christianity.

The oldest data on the profession of religion by the inhabitants of the regions that are now the "Netherlands" were passed down by the Romans. Contrary to what ancient sources seem to suggest, the Rhine, which clearly formed the boundary of the Roman Empire, did not form the boundary between residential areas of Celts and Germans. Germans settled south of it (Germani Cisrhenani), and many place names and archaeological finds indicate the presence of Celts north of the Rhine. Between these "Celtic – Germanic peoples" and later the Roman conquerors (romanization) a cultural exchange took place. An adaptation of polytheistic religions and other myths occurred among the various tribes, absorbing influences from Germanic, Celtic and later Roman mythology. Gods such as Nehalennia, Hludana and Sandraudiga are of Celtic or Celto-Germanic, origin; the Germanic people had such gods as Wodan, Donar and Frigg/Freya from Scandinavia. Jupiter, Minerva and Venus were introduced by the Romans. Tacitus described the creation myth of Mannus, a primitive man from which all Germanic tribes were said to have emerged. The Celts and Germans in the Low Countries were also most likely to have had tree shrines, following the example of the Old Norse Yggdrasil and the Saxon Irminsul and Donar's oak. Temples were probably built only during and after the romanization. Examples have been preserved in Empel and Elst.

From the 4th to the 6th century AD, the Great Migration took place, in which the small Celtic-Germanic-Roman tribes in the Low Countries were gradually supplanted by three major Germanic tribes: the Franks, the Frisians and Saxons. Around 500 the Franks, initially residing between the Rhine and the Somme, adopted Christianity, forced by their king Chlodovech. A large part of the area south of the Meuse River was controlled from the early Middle Ages to 1559 by Archdeacon of Kempenland, which was part of the Diocese of Tongeren-Maastricht-Liège. The see of this diocese, successively the cities of Tongeren, Maastricht and Liège, made up the base by which this part of the Netherlands was probably Christianized. According to tradition, the first Bishop of Maastricht, Servatius, was buried in this city in 384 CE. Only Bishop Domitianus (c. 535) is documented as having resided in Maastricht.

At the start of the 6th century, the first (Hiberno-Scottish) missionaries arrived. They were later replaced by Anglo-Saxon missionaries, who eventually succeeded in converting most of the inhabitants of the southern Netherlands to Christianity by the 8th century.

From the late 7th century, missionaries coming from England and Ireland, such as Boniface, Lebuinus, Ludger, Plechelm, Willehad and especially Willibrord, sought to convert the inhabitants of the areas north of the Meuse and Rhine rivers to Christianity. They had varying degrees of success, as attested by the (not always reliable) descriptions of their lives that have been written about them. While some sermons yielded success, Frisian king Radboud refused to be baptized by Wulfram. Because he was assured of getting to heaven if he repented and converted, Radboud instead chose an afterlife with his ancestors who, according to Wulfram, were in hell. After the Frisian–Frankish wars (c. 600–793) and the Saxon Wars (772–804), the Low Countries all fell under the rule of the Christian Frankish kings. They wanted their people to be both religious and political subjects, as the kings claimed divine right of leadership. The Old Saxon Baptismal Vow describes how one must renounce his old gods (described as "devils") and submit to the Christian Trinity.

In the 8th century, Anglo-Saxon missionaries such as Boniface continued efforts to Christianize the land inhabited by the Frisians. But Boniface was killed in 754 near Dokkum by the Frisians, because they thought he carried gold. The missionaries gradually succeeded in the conversion of the North in the 8th century. By the beginning of the 9th century, the Saxon-controlled northeastern regions were also subjugated and Christianized by Lebuinus, Plechelmus and Ludgerus. It took until 1000 CE before all pagan people were Christianized, and the Frisian and Saxon religions had died out. Elements of these religions were absorbed into the Christian religion, which is syncretic. During the following centuries, Catholic Christianity was the main religion in the Netherlands, but other practices likely survived in the conservative societies of the villages.

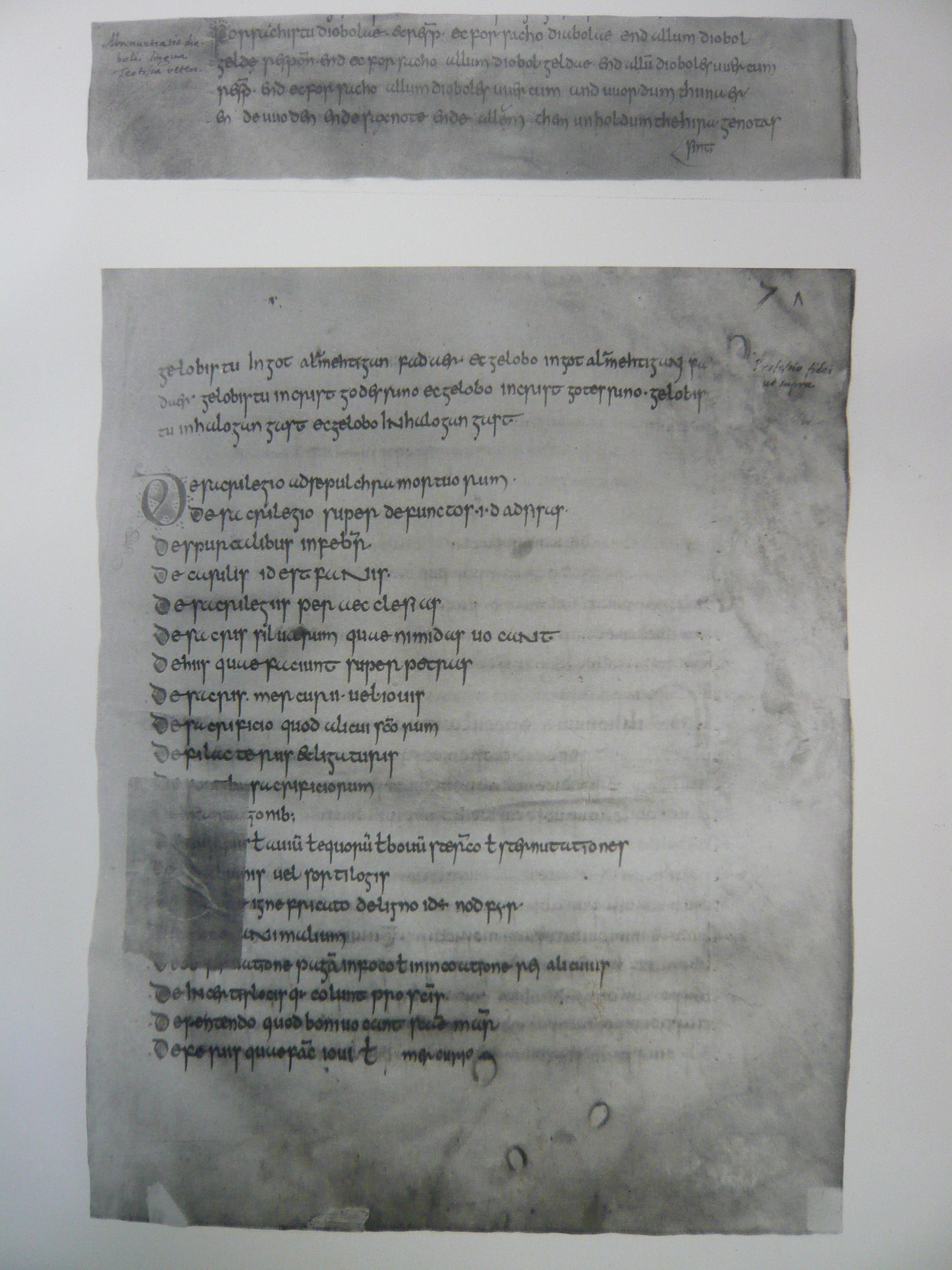
The Old Saxon Baptismal Vow: "Forsachistu diobolae.." (Forsake devils) and "gelobistu in got alamehtigan fadaer" (believe in god almighty father). Left caption in a later writing: "Abrinuciatio diaboli lingua Teotisca veter." = (abjuration of the devil in Old German). Under the Baptismal Vow in Latin is an enumeration of the first 20 practices in the Indiculus superstitionum et paganiarum.

== High and Late Middle Ages ==
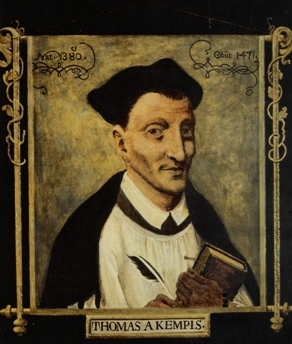
Thomas à Kempis, the author of The Imitation of Christ (c. 1418–1427)

Religious life was ubiquitous in medieval society. Important abbeys such Rolduc, Susteren, Sint Odiliënberg and Egmond were highly influential in the countryside. They were centers of learning and literacy. In the Christian centers of Utrecht and Maastricht, powerful chapters were established. From the 13th century, monastic and knightly orders settled in many cities, such as the Franciscans, Dominicans and knights of the Teutonic Order. They also took part in many of the 12th- and 13th-century crusades to the Holy Land (see Frisian participation in the Crusades).

Where justice until the 12th century existed largely in actions by kangaroo courts, which often administered trial by ordeal to establish a person's guilt or innocence, in the course of the 12th century, the ecclesiastical and secular powers took over more control of the justice system. The church rules (in particular by the Fourth Council of the Lateran in 1215) and the monarchs maintained the order. At the end of the Middle Ages, the Devotio Moderna (among others Geert Groote and Thomas à Kempis) created a spiritual innovation. In the 14th and 15th centuries, the first calls were heard for religious reform from within the Catholic Church. Geert Groote established the Brethren of the Common Life, an influential mystical order. The influence of humanism (particularly through the teachings of Erasmus and Dirck Coornhert) changed the Dutch world. It began to shift from a theocentric to an anthropocentric worldview.

== Reformation in the Early Modern Period ==
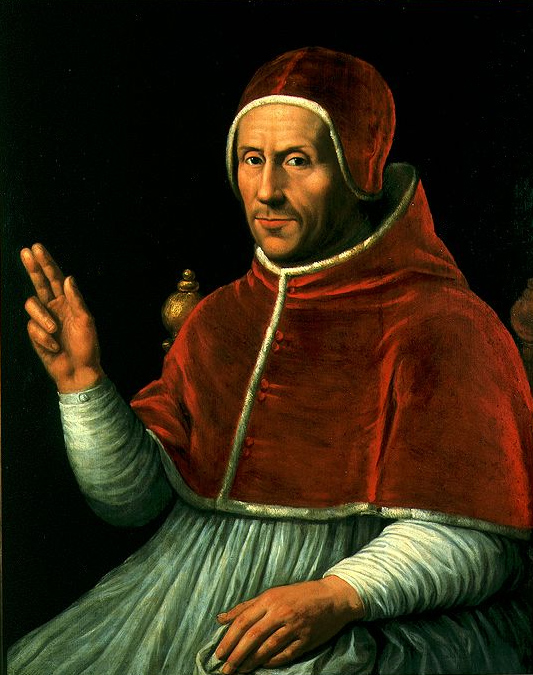
Adrian of Utrecht (Pope Adrian VI)

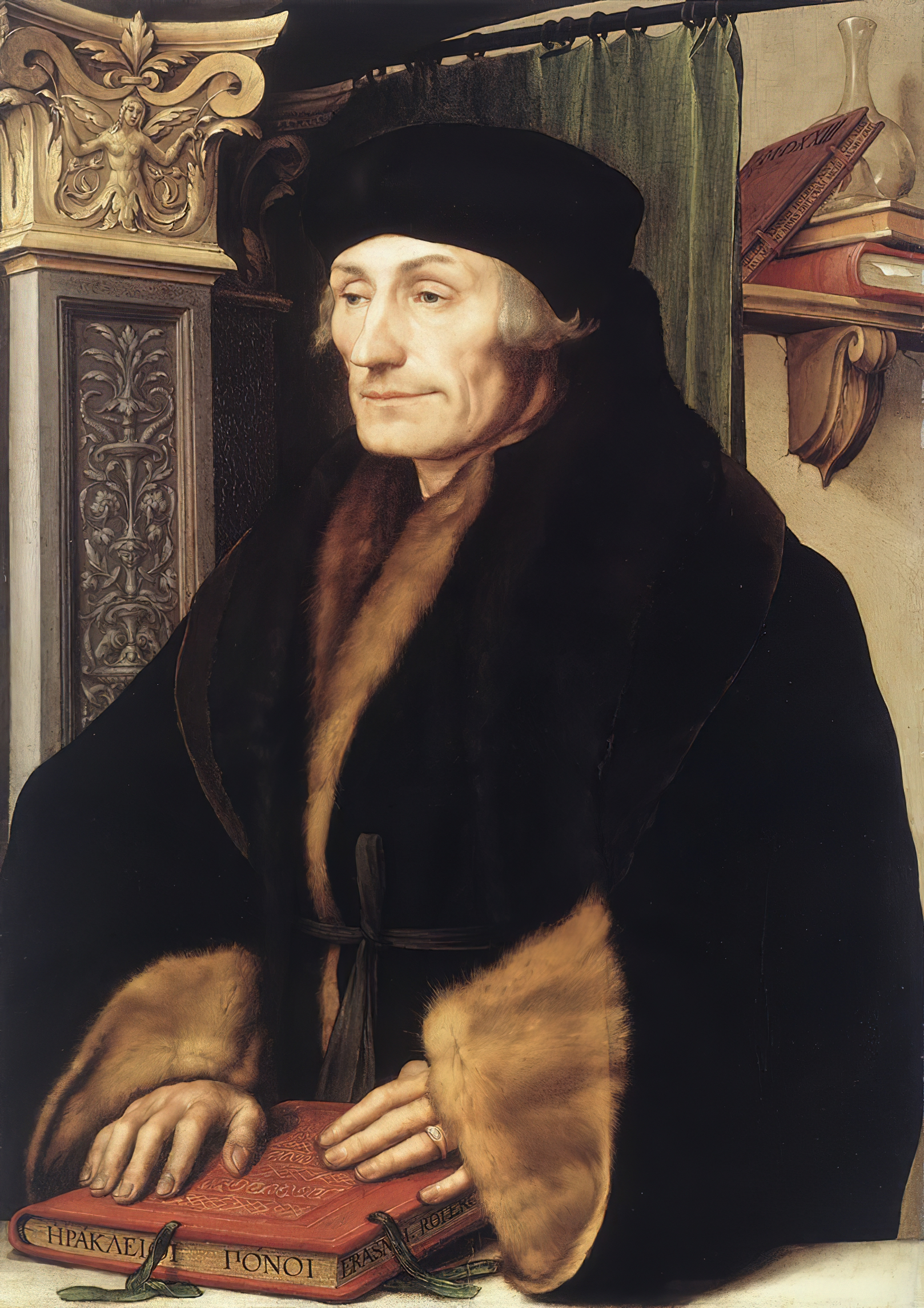
Erasmus in 1523 as depicted by Hans Holbein the Younger

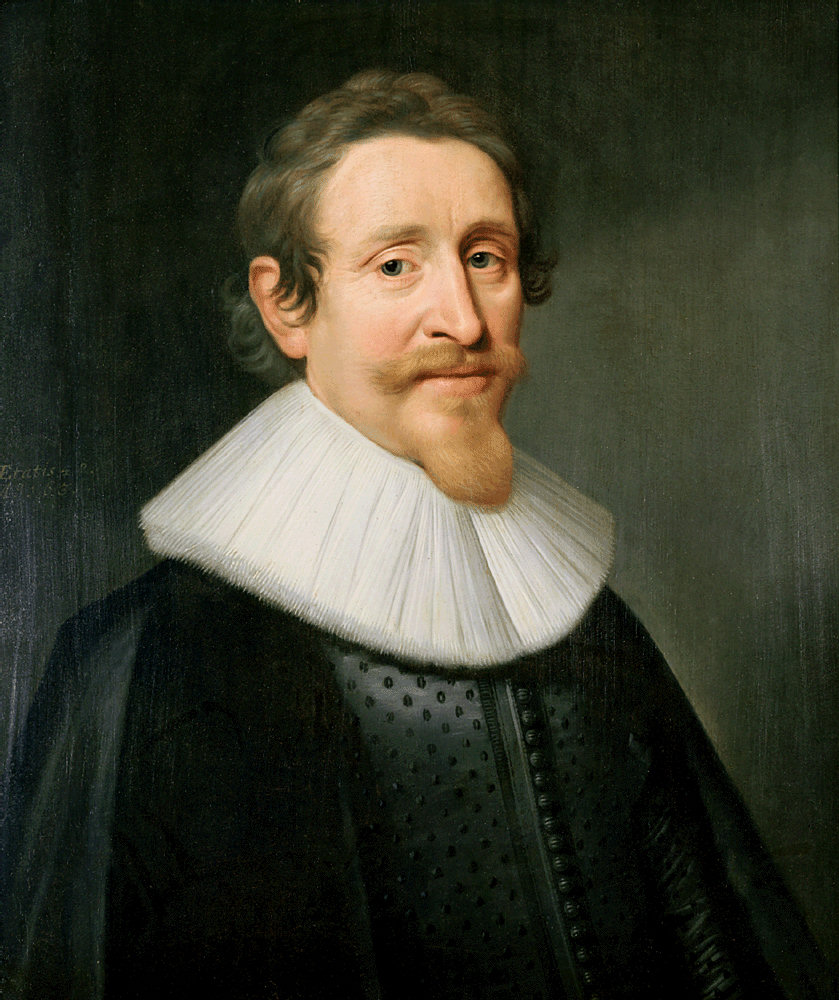
Hugo Grotius

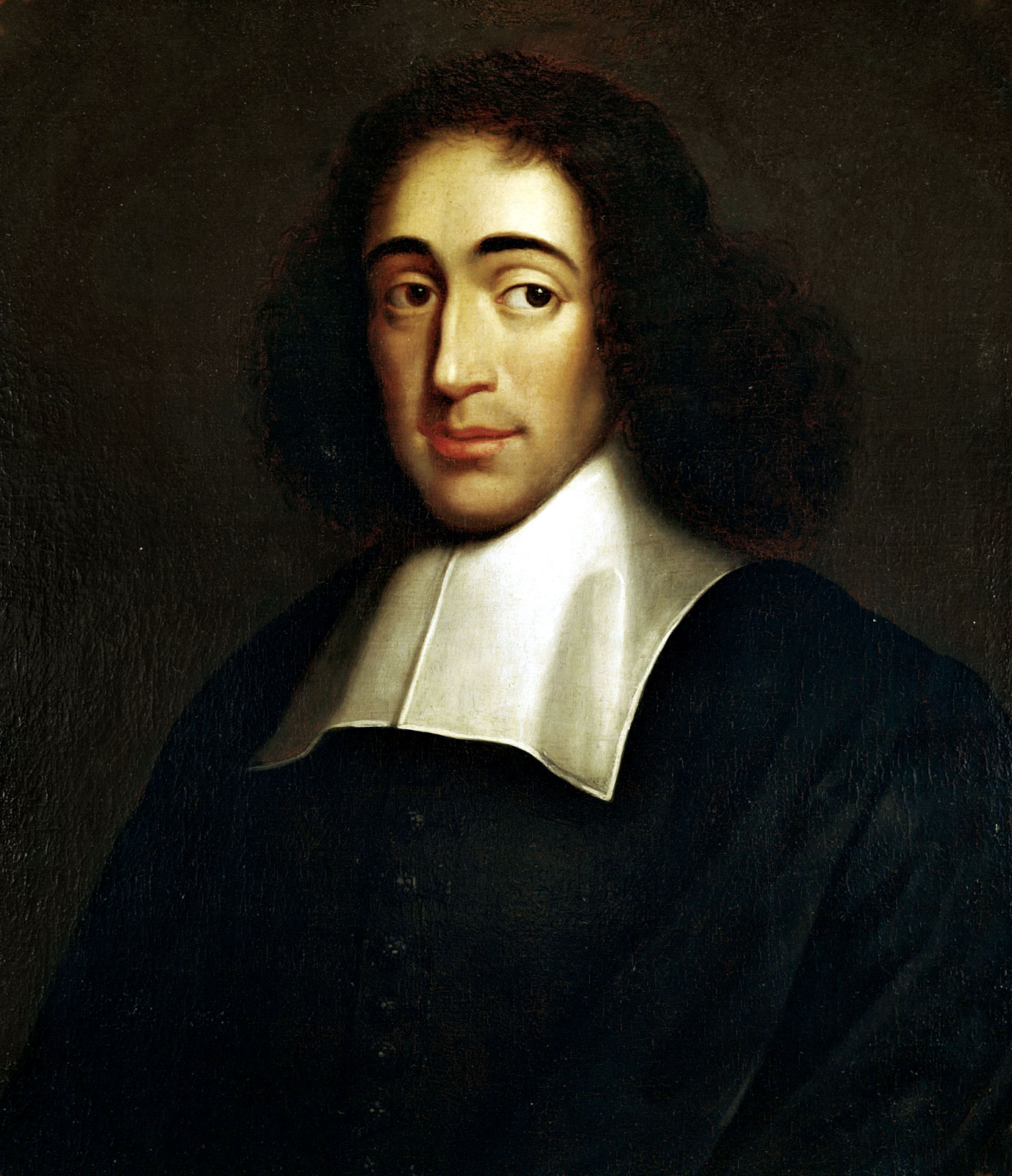
Portrait of Benedictus de Spinoza (painting by an unknown artist, ca. 1665), the author of Tractatus Theologico-Politicus (1670)

Catholicism dominated Dutch religion until the early 16th century, when the Protestant Reformation began to develop. Lutheranism did not gain much support among the Dutch, but Calvinism, introduced two decades later, did. It began its spread in the Westhoek and the County of Flanders, where secret sermons in Dutch, called hagenpreken ("hedgerow orations"), were held outdoors. Gradually discontent among the Dutch grew, and erupted in 1566 with the so-called Beeldenstorm, a surge of iconoclasm. This quickly spread among all Dutch regions and finally resulted in what would become the Dutch revolt from Catholicism and Spanish control. During the Renaissance and the Protestant Reformation, an independent Dutch religious tradition began to take shape in the northern parts of the independent Netherlands.

The most prominent Dutch theologian was the humanist Desiderius Erasmus. He was critical of the abuses within the Catholic Church and called for reform, but he kept his distance from Martin Luther and Philip Melancthon. He continued to recognise the authority of the Pope. Erasmus emphasized a middle way, with a deep respect for traditional faith, piety and grace, and rejected Luther's emphasis on faith alone. Erasmus therefore remained a Catholic all his life. In relation to clerical abuses in the Church, Erasmus remained committed to reforming the Church from within. He also held to Catholic doctrines such as that of free will, which some Calvinist Reformers rejected in favour of the doctrine of predestination. His middle road approach disappointed and even angered scholars in both camps.

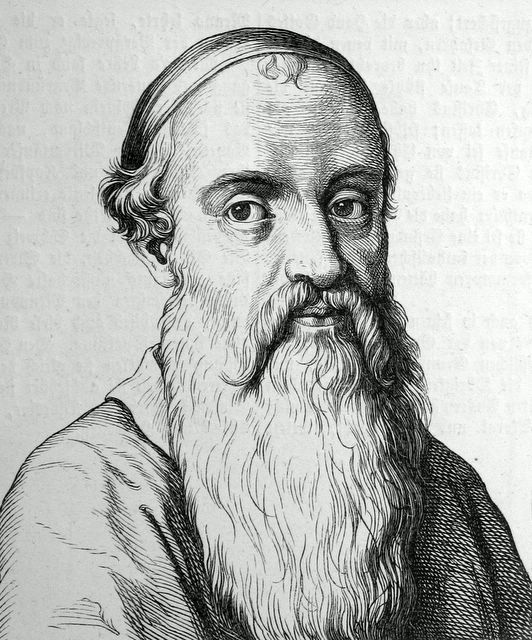
Menno Simons. The Mennonites are named after him.

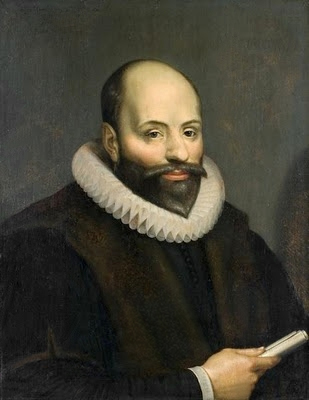
Jacobus Arminius, the Reformed theologian and the father of Arminianism.

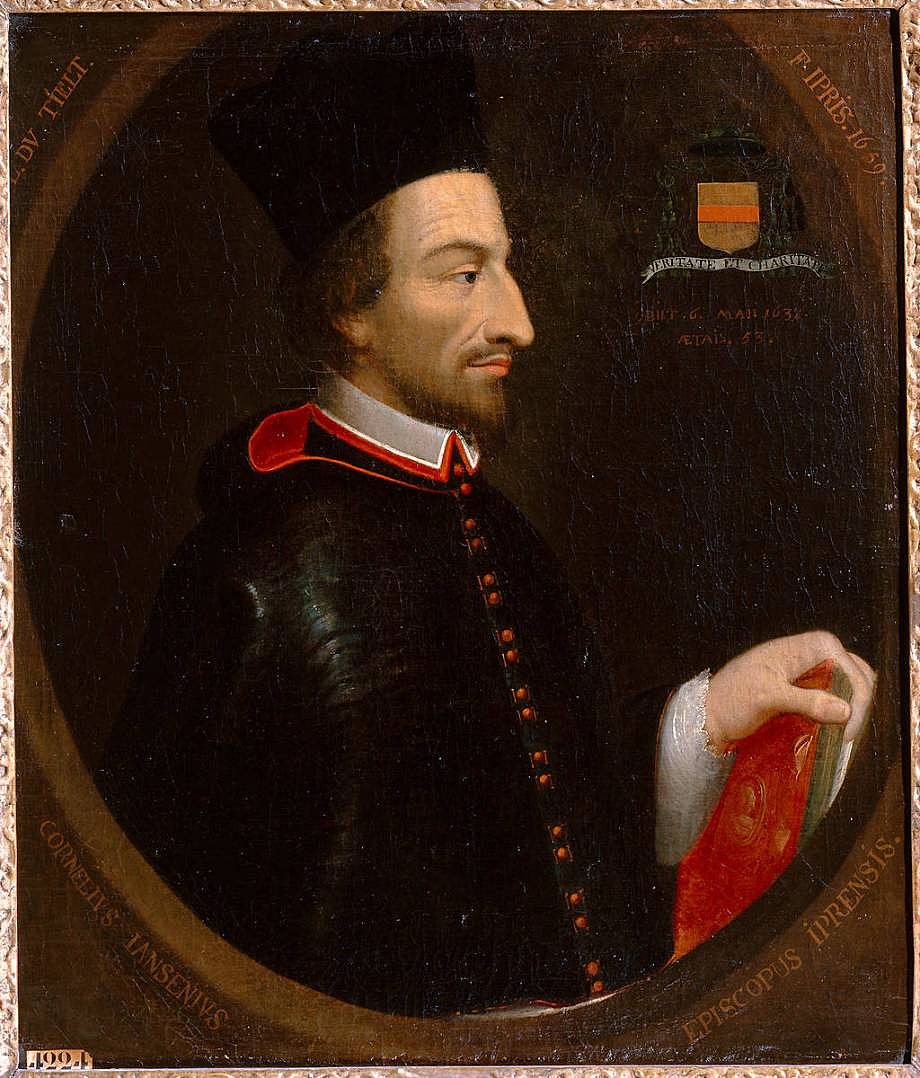
Cornelius Otto Jansen, the father of the Roman Catholic reform movement known as Jansenism in the Southern Netherlands.

The 16th and 17th century were characterized by the Protestant Reformation, which greatly influenced the history of the Netherlands, especially in western and northern areas of the country. They also had influence with the eastern English shires, with which they were in contact through trading across the North Sea. The first wave of Reformation, initiated by Luther, did not come to the Netherlands.

The second wave of the Protestant Reformation, Anabaptism, became very popular in the counties of Holland and Friesland. Anabaptism was part of the Radical Reformation, a response to corruption both in the Catholic Church and in the expanding Magisterial Protestant movement. They refused to live the old way, and began new communities, which led to intense persecution. A prominent Dutch Anabaptist was Menno Simons, who initiated the Mennonite church. Another Anabaptist group attempted to take control of Amsterdam in 1535, in what is referred to as the Wederdopersoproer but was violently repressed and all participants killed. The action was inspired by the Annabaptist dominion of Münster one year earlier when Anabaptists, some from the Netherlands, took control of Münster. This action ended after a lengthy siege and the execution of the self proclaimed king Jantje van Leyden and other leaders. Anabaptists survived throughout the centuries and they were recognized by the States-General of the Netherlands in 1578. Institutionalized Dutch baptism was a model for both English and American Baptists.

The third wave of the Reformation, Calvinism, arrived in the Netherlands in the 1540s. Part of both the elite and commoners, mostly in Flanders, adopted this influence. Then in control of the Low Countries, the Spanish government, under Philip II started harsh persecution campaigns, supported by the Inquisition of the Catholic Church, as Protestantism was seen as threatening the royal government. In reaction to this persecution, the Calvinists rebelled. In the Beeldenstorm in 1566, they conducted iconoclasm, destroying statues, paintings, and other religious depictions and artifacts in churches. Also in 1566 William the Silent, Prince of Orange, a convert to Calvinism, started the Eighty Years' War to liberate the Calvinist Dutch from the Catholic Spaniards.

The counties of Holland and Zeeland were conquered by Calvinists in 1572. Numerous residents were already Calvinist in Holland and Zeeland at that time, but the other states were still almost entirely Catholic. The estates of Holland, led by Paulus Buys, decided to support William the Silent. All churches in the Calvinist territories became Calvinist and most of the population in these territories converted to or were forced to convert to Calvinism. Because the Netherlands had gained independence from Spain over both political and religious issues, it chose to practice certain forms of tolerance toward people of certain other religions. It opened its borders for religious dissenters (Protestants and Jews) from elsewhere. For instance, René Descartes, a French Catholic, lived in the Netherlands for most of his adult life. As the Reformation reached England, some Puritans fled from persecution to Amsterdam and other Dutch cities. (Jews had been expelled from Spain and Portugal in the late 15th and 16th centuries if they refused to convert to Catholicism, and were prohibited from England.) But the Calvinist-dominated areas maintained persecution and later discrimination against native Dutch Catholics.

Philip II of Spain was the hereditary ruler of the Netherlands. As a devout Catholic, Philip believed he was obligated to fight Protestantism, which also threatened his rule. After the Beeldenstorm, he sent troops to suppress Protestantism in the Netherlands. The Spanish conquered the southern Netherlands (Flanders and Brabant). Protestants in this area, many of them prosperous merchants, fled en masse to Holland, Zeeland, and Friesland. An extreme example was the city of Hondschoote, where the population dropped from 18,000 to 385 inhabitants. Antwerp, formerly the most powerful city in the Low Countries, lost more than half its residents to this exodus.

In the Calvinist-controlled northern counties, many of the remaining Catholics were tending toward converting to Protestantism for temporal gain, to survive in the changed society. In the early 17th century, the Roman Catholic Jesuits launched a Counter Reformation in order to rekindle faith among Catholics. In those areas where the Jesuits could operate, the Dutch Catholics were supported in their faith and some Calvinists reverted to Catholicism. However, the number of Catholics dwindled due to the lack of priests, especially in rural areas of Gelre, Overijssel, Groningen, and Friesland.

At the same time, the larger western cities received an influx of Protestant immigrants from Germany, Flanders, and France and developed a Protestant character. Strict Calvinists converted a belt of land from the southwest (the province of Zeeland), via the Veluwe, to the north of the Netherlands (to the city of Staphorst) during the 17th and even as late as the 18th centuries. This remains strictly Calvinist until this day.

During the Twelve Years' Truce (between 1609 and 1621) in the Eighty Years' War, a civil war along religious lines developed in the Netherlands. The Synod of Dort tried to bring an end to an internal theological conflict within the Calvinist church between two tendencies of Calvinism: the liberal Arminians or Remonstrants and the strict Gomarists or Contra-Remonstrants. Civil war broke out in the 1610s between strict and liberal Calvinists. The liberal States of Holland left the Republic. The strict Calvinist side won (Prince Maurice of Orange and the other provinces) and Johan van Oldebarnevelt, the official head of state of the County of Holland, was executed. Calvinism became the de facto state religion. Only Calvinists (and, in some cases, Jews) were allowed to hold political office. Other Christian denominations were mostly tolerated, although discriminated against, and believers were not allowed to practice their religion in public. Judaism was allowed in public, and Lutheranism only in larger cities. It was permitted only on the condition of the congregations maintaining Calvinist church interior styles, without having crucifixes, as were still displayed in Scandinavian Lutheran cathedrals.

In 1648, Spain and the Holy Roman Empire recognized the independence of the Netherlands in the Treaty of Westphalia. The Netherlands included the "Seven Provinces" of the Dutch Republic, which were Protestant, but also a Roman Catholic area. This Generaliteitsland was governed by the States-General; it roughly included the current provinces of North Brabant and Limburg. The Netherlands became known among dissenting Anglicans (such as Puritans), many Protestants, and Jews for its relative religious tolerance; it became a refuge for the persecuted and a home for many of these immigrants.

English Puritans in Amsterdam formed what was known as the "Ancient Church of Amsterdam", whose leaders included wealthy merchants such as Edward Bennett (1577-bef. 1651), a member of the Virginia Company and later developer of a large plantation in the colony of Virginia beginning in the mid-1620s. In the 17th and 18th centuries, the proportion of first-generation immigrants from outside the Netherlands among the population of Amsterdam was nearly 50%. Many Jews, especially from Antwerp, migrated to Amsterdam. Jews governed their communities under their own laws and formed a separate society. The Netherlands hosted religious refugees, including Puritans from England (the most famous of the latter were the Pilgrims, who in the early 17th century emigrated to what became the Massachusetts Bay Colony in North America). Protestant Huguenots from France fled to Amsterdam after repeal in 1689 of the Edict of Nantes and renewed persecution and attacks from Catholics.

== 19th century ==
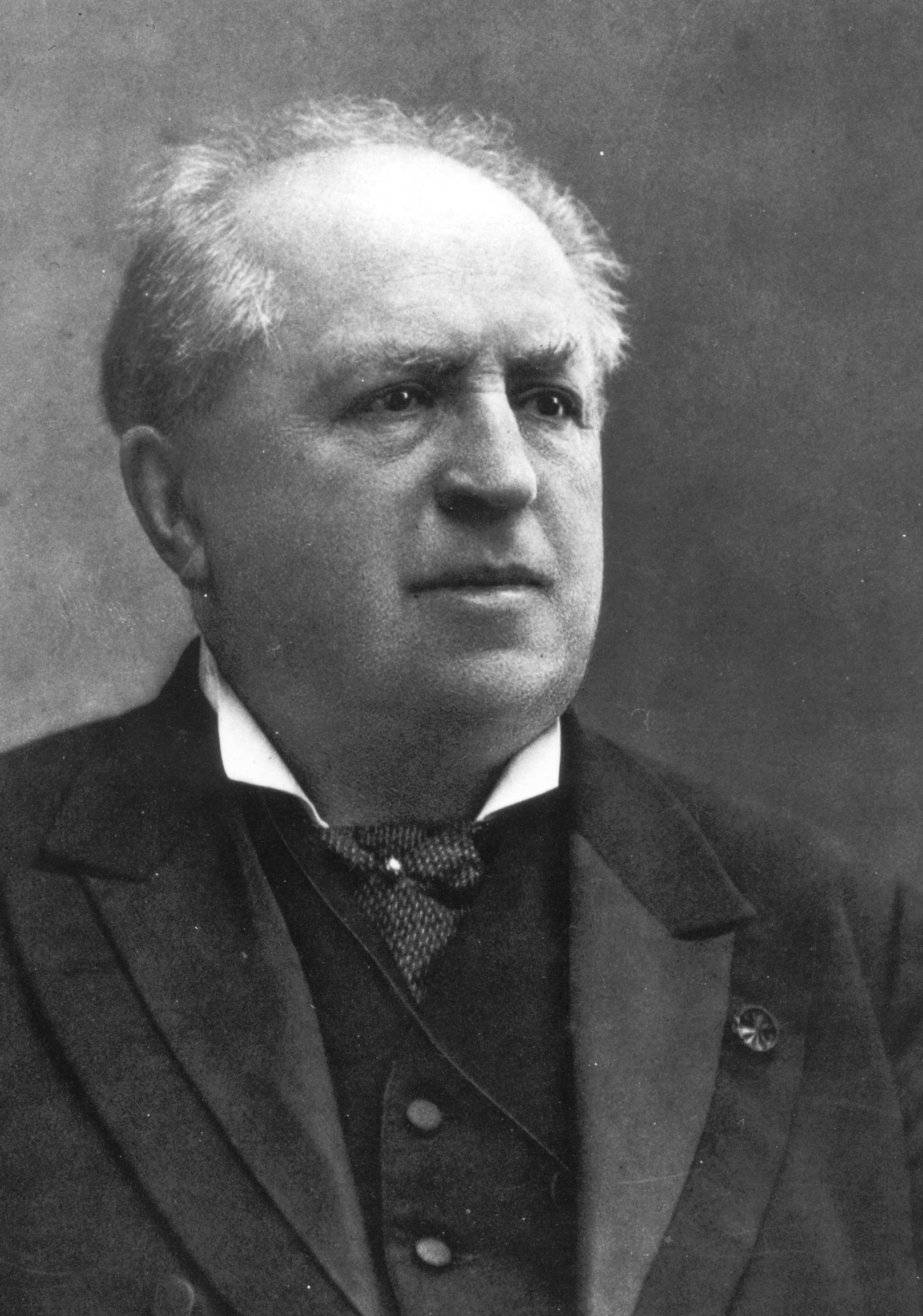
Abraham Kuyper

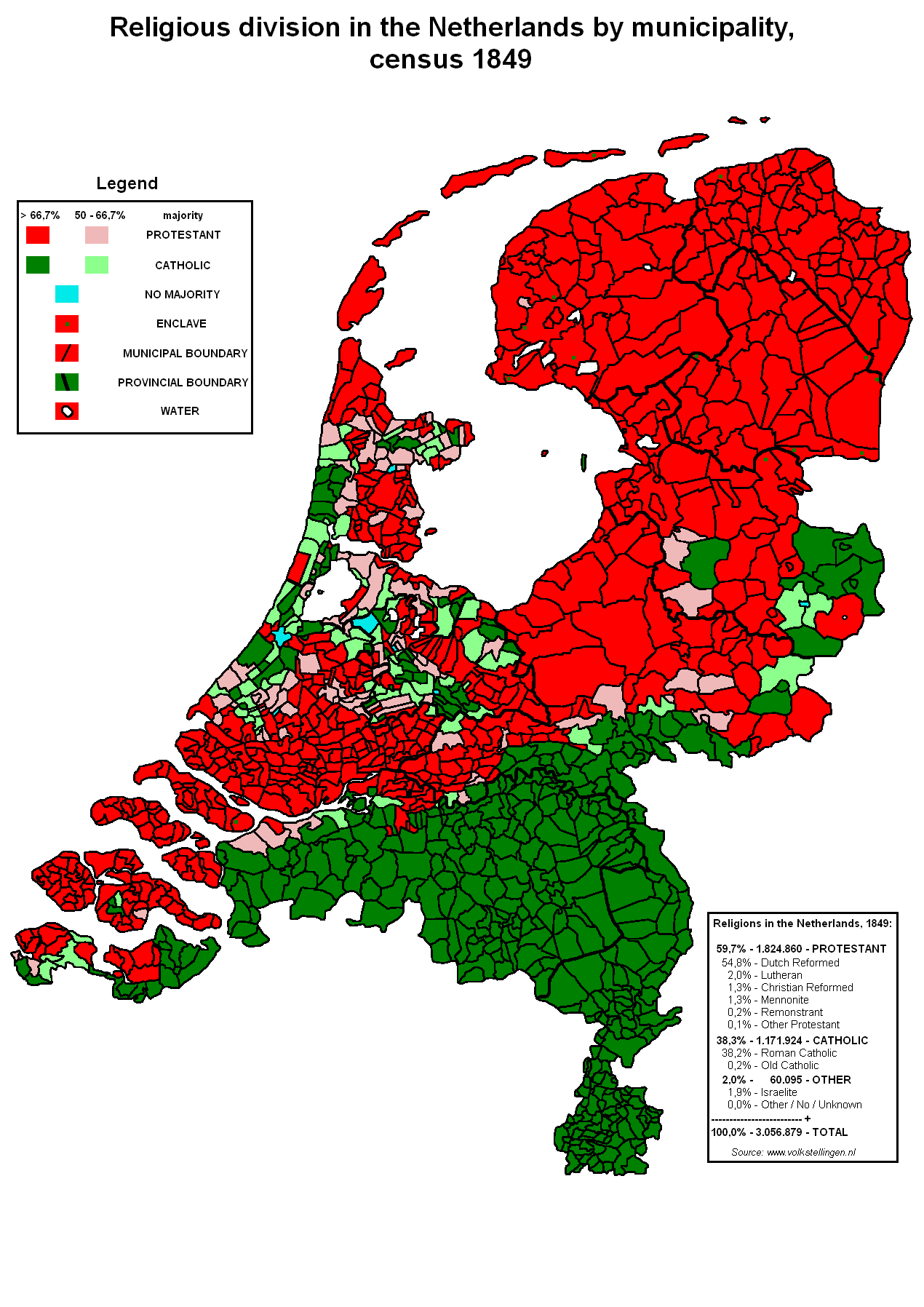
Religious division in the Netherlands in 1849. Catholicism holds a majority in green areas. Protestantism holds a majority in red areas.

During the 19th century, there was a rising conflict among Catholics, liberal Calvinists, and orthodox Calvinists. The Dutch solution, known as pillarization, lasted until the 1960s.

Following the invasion of forces of Revolutionary France in 1795, the Batavian Republic was established for a time, creating equal rights for all religious groups in the Netherlands. In 1813, the Calvinist Republic united with the Catholic Southern Netherlands to form the United Kingdom of the Netherlands.

The union split in 1830 after the Belgian Revolution, which was partially motivated by religious differences between Protestants and Catholics, as well as by the political split between Orangists (royalists) and Liberals (mainly from Brussels and Ghent). The position of Catholics in the Kingdom of the Netherlands worsened. The Catholic episcopal hierarchy was forbidden and Catholics were forbidden to hold religious processions in all provinces except for Noord Brabant and Limburg.

A liberal Calvinist elite dominated the Netherlands for a period, including the national bureaucracy and the Dutch Reformed Church. An opposition movement developed. In 1834, led by Rev. Hendrik de Cock, a group seceded from the Dutch Reformed Church in what was known as the Afscheiding.

Roughly fifty years later, in 1886, another group of orthodox Calvinists, led by Abraham Kuyper, split from the Dutch Reformed Church. In 1892, they founded the Reformed Churches in the Netherlands, one of the major neo-Calvinist denominations. Kuyper also organized a range of religiously inspired organizations. He was inspired by his conception of sphere sovereignty, the separation of Church and State. He founded an orthodox Calvinist newspaper, labour union, schools, a university and a political party.

During this period Catholics began to develop their own non-governmental institutions. The Netherlands became dominated among three religious pillars, an orthodox Calvinist, a Catholic, and a neutral one. These subcultures generally did not interfere with each other. During the 20th century, a separate socialist pillar would also develop. This phenomenon is called pillarization. There was considerable religious tolerance among these subcultures, and they cooperated with each other at the level of government.

The social distance grew. People read different newspapers; by the 1930s they listened to different radio programs. Catholic and Protestant children generally lived in different neighborhoods and provinces, and did not play together. Adults did not socialize across religious lines. Marriage across religious lines grew rare.

Jews had become fully integrated into Dutch society after 1795. Most Jews in the 19th and 20th centuries became later become aligned within the socialist pillar, many became highly secularized and adopted mainstream dress rather than that associated with Orthodox Judaism. They formed a considerable minority, especially in certain cities: one-eighth of the population of Amsterdam was Jewish.

== The Second World War ==
In 1940, the Netherlands was occupied by Nazi Germany. Their forces rounded up and deported most of the Dutch Jewish community to concentration camps in eastern Europe, exterminating them. One major example of this was the Frank Family, who was made famous by the publishing of the diary of one of the daughters, Anne Frank.

In February 1941 after Nazi occupation, a general strike took place in Amsterdam and the surrounding areas against the first razzia, a raid to collect Jews. This was the largest act of resistance in the Netherlands against the persecution of Jews during the Second World War. The main resistance groups were composed of conservative Calvinists, Communists and Catholics, while liberals and others were underrepresented. An important action of the resistance movement was hiding Jews from Nazis.

There were 140,000 Jews recorded in 1940 in the Netherlands. 20,000 of them were free from persecution, because they were married to Aryans, or because some of their parents and grandparents were non-Jews. Another 20,000 Jews hid from the Germans. Of the 101,000 Jews that the Nazis deported, only 1,000 returned after the war. The percentage of Dutch Jews who were exterminated was much higher than in other countries, including Germany.

== Secularization ==
Beliefs in the Netherlands (2015), based on in-depth interviewing by Radboud University and Vrije Universiteit Amsterdam
1. Atheism (24.0%)
2. Agnosticism (34.0%)
3. Ietsism (28.0%)
4. Theism (14.0%)
Religions in the Netherlands (2015), based on in-depth interviewing by Radboud University and Vrije Universiteit Amsterdam
1. No affiliation (67.8%)
2. Roman Catholic Church (11.7%)
3. Protestant Church of the Netherlands (8.60%)
4. Islam (5.00%)
5. Other Protestant denominations (4.20%)
6. Hinduism and Buddhism (2.00%)
7. Other churches and religions (0.70%)
Religions in the Netherlands (2013), based on self-reported numbers by religious organizations (KASKI).
1. No religion (55.1%)
2. Roman Catholic (23.7%)
3. Protestant Church in the Netherlands (10.2%)
4. Islam (5.00%)
5. Buddhism (1.50%)
6. Hinduism (1.20%)
7. Other religion, including other Protestant denominations (3.30%)

Until late into the 20th century, the predominant religion in the Netherlands was Christianity. Although religious diversity remains, there has been a decline in religious adherence and practice in the 21st century. In 2006, 34 percent of the Dutch population identified as Christian church members. In 2015, that had declined to about 25 percent (11.7% Roman Catholic, 8.6% PKN, 4.2% other small Protestant denominations). Another 5 percent is Muslim, and 2 percent adheres to Hinduism or Buddhism. These percentages are based on independent in-depth interviewing by Radboud University and Vrije Universiteit Amsterdam. According to the CBS in 2018, 53% of the Dutch were religiously unaffiliated, 37% were Christians (out of whom 22% registered Catholics, 15% Protestants – 6% PKN + 6% hervormd + 3% gereformeerd), 5% were Muslims, and 5% adherents of other religions.

Secularization, or the decline in religious adherence and practice, first became noticeable after 1960 in the Protestant rural provinces of Friesland and Groningen. It became more obvious in Amsterdam, Rotterdam and the other large cities in the west. Finally, the Catholic south also showed declines in religious practice and belief. During the 1960s and 1970s, the traditional pillarization began to weaken and the population became less religious. During the late 20th century, in keeping with changes in their society, the Dutch liberalized their policies on abortion, drug use, euthanasia, homosexuality, and prostitution. In 1971, 39% of the Dutch population were members of the Roman Catholic Church; by 2014, their share of the population had dropped to 23.3% (church-provided KASKI data). The proportion of adherents of mainline Protestantism declined in the same period from 31% to 10% (church-provided KASKI data). KASKI (Katholiek Sociaal-Kerkelijk Insituut / Catholic Social-Ecclesiastical Institute) is based on self-reported information by the Catholic and Protestant churches. They reported a higher number of church members than what was found by independent in-depth interviewing by Radboud University and Vrije Universiteit Amsterdam. Some of that may be attributed to methods of data collection. According tot KASKI, the total number of members of Christian groups in the Netherlands has decreased from approximately 7,013,163 (43.22% overall population) in 2003 to 5,730,852 (34.15% overall population) in 2013. An additional 4.2% of the population adhere to other Protestant churches. With 32.2% of the Dutch identifying as adhering to a religion, among which 25% adhere to Christianity and 5% to Islam, the Netherlands is one of the least religious countries of Europe.

In 2015, approximately 67.8% of the population claimed no religious affiliation, up from 61% in 2006, 53% in 1996, 43% 1979, and 33% in 1966. In the 21st century, a large majority of the Dutch population believes in the separation of church and state, that is, that religion should not play a decisive role in politics or public education. Religion is also decreasingly seen as a social binder. Religion in the Netherlands is generally considered a personal matter, which is not supposed to be propagated in public.

By contrast, there has been a religious revival in the Protestant Bible Belt of the Netherlands. In addition, there has been growth of Hindu and Muslim communities as a result of immigration and higher birth rates. As a result of the declining religious adherence after the sixties, the two major strands of Calvinism, the Dutch Reformed Church and the Reformed Churches in the Netherlands, together with a small Lutheran group, began to cooperate. They identified first as the Samen op weg Kerken ("Together on the road churches"). Since 2004, they formed the Protestant Church in the Netherlands, a united Protestant church. During the same period, Islam increased from 0% to 5%, mainly by Muslims from Surinam and Indonesia as a result of decolonization; Turkey and Morocco, as migrant workers; and Iraq, Iran, Bosnia and Afghanistan as political refugees. In the early 21st century, religious tensions between native Dutch people and migrant Muslims increased in some areas. The popular politician Pim Fortuyn provoked controversy by defending the Dutch liberal culture against what he considered a "backward religion", conservative Islam. Stricter immigration laws were enacted. Religious tensions heightened after film director Theo van Gogh was killed in 2004 by Mohammed Bouyeri.

A December 2014 survey by the Vrije Universiteit Amsterdam concluded that, for the first time, there were more atheists (25%) than theists (17%) in the Netherlands. The majority of the population identified as agnostic (31%) or ietsistic (27%). Atheism, ietsism, agnosticism, and Christian atheism keep rising; the first three being widely accepted and the last being more or less considered to be non-controversial. Among those who adhere to Christianity, there are high percentages of atheists, agnostics and ietsists, since affiliation with a Christian denomination is also used in a way of cultural identification in the different parts (especially the south) of the Netherlands. According to research in 2015, a more generalized rise in individual spirituality has ended. In 2006, 40 percent of respondents considered themselves spiritual. But in 2015, this had dropped to 31 percent.

== See also ==
- History of the Netherlands
- Religion in the Netherlands
- History of the Jews in the Netherlands
