= Saxon paganism =

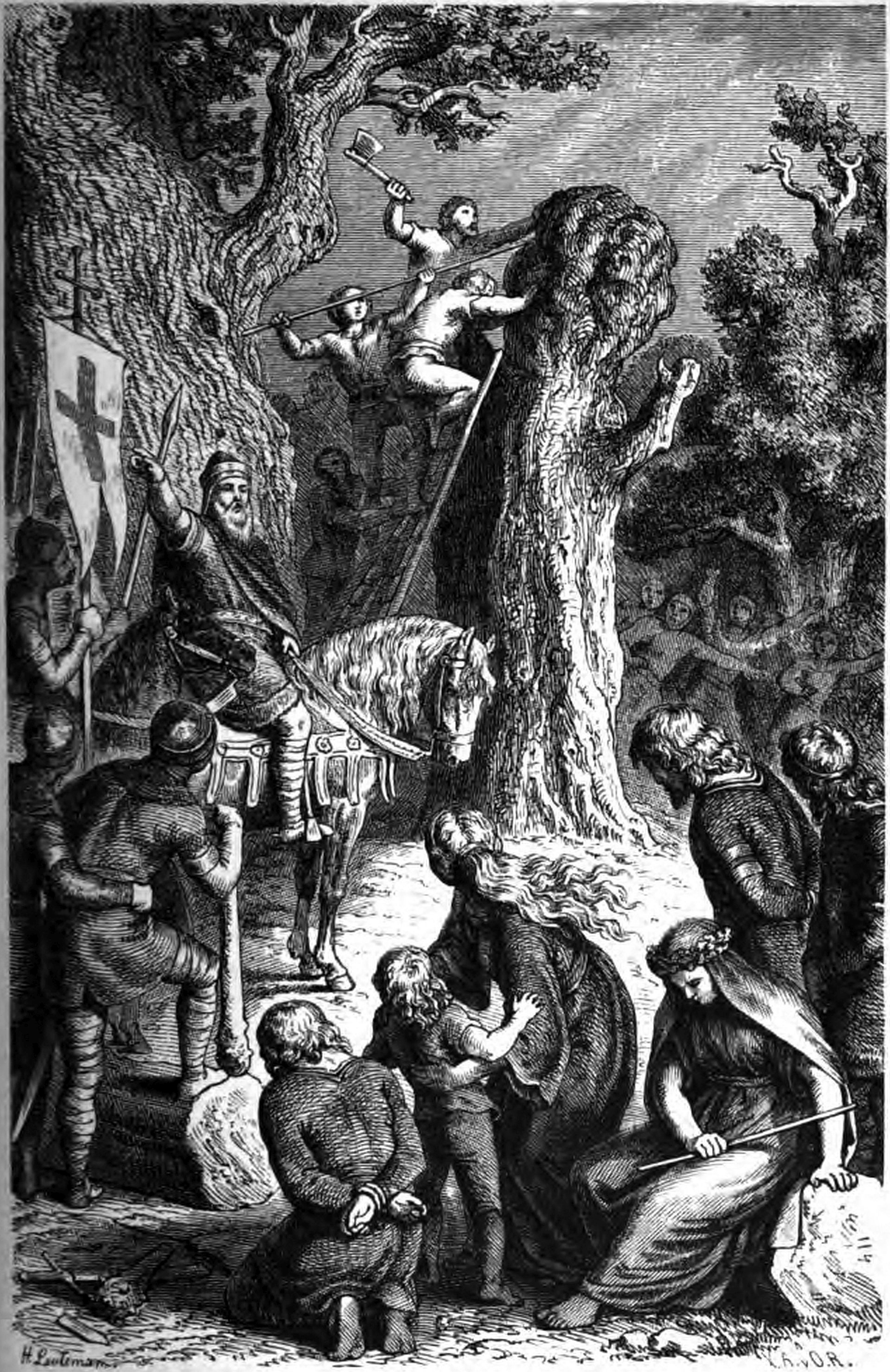
The Destruction of the Irminsul by Charlemagne by Heinrich Leutemann, 1882.

Saxon paganism, sometimes known as Continental Saxon paganism or Saxon heathenism, refers to the religion of the Saxons before their Christianization in the wake of the Saxon Wars (772–804) of Charlemagne. Distinct from its closely related Anglo-Saxon counterpart, Saxon paganism was a polytheistic belief system and part of the larger Continental Germanic mythology, with a focus on the sacredness of pillar-like objects (such as Irminsul) and sacred groves, many of which were destroyed.

After Christianization, monasteries repurposed Saxon beliefs and values in new Christian literature, such as the Old Saxon epic poem Heliand, and used the region as a barrier between Christendom and the Slavic and Norse pagans to the north and east. Reportedly, paganism continued among the Saxons until the 12th century.

== Beliefs ==
Saxons worshipped a core pantheon somewhat familiar to the other Germanic pagan religions, including Uuôden (Odin), Thunaer (Thor), and Froho (Freyr). Saxon royalty drew their lineage from an ancestor named Saxnôt and, given how the Old Saxon baptismal vow calls on the converts to renounce "Thunaer, Woden, and Saxnot", this figure might have been an ancestral god from which Saxon rulers derived a divinity. The name possibly derives from the word seax, the signature blade of the Saxons.

For the ancient Saxons, politics and religion were intertwined, with the paramount importance of sacred rites, objects, and sites and tribal councils beginning with the invocation of their gods. Among such practices, drawing lots to determine wartime leadership was used as a kind of divination, entrusting the gods to decide. The concept of wurd (wyrd in Anglo Saxon) refers to an inescapable, impersonal fate or fatalism.

Holiest of all was Irminsul, a pillar-like object described as being near Heresburg (now Obermarsberg, North Rhine-Westphalia) and often associated with other holy trees of Germanic paganism, including Donar's Oak or the sacred tree at Uppsala. In the De miraculis sancti Alexandri by Benedictine monk Rudolf of Fulda (d. 865), Irminsul is described as a great wooden pillar and worshipped beneath under the open sky and that its name suggests it is a universal, all-sustaining pillar. In Old Saxon, Irminsûl means 'great pillar' and Irmin is a cognate of Yggr, one of the names of Odin, suggesting Irminsul is related to the world tree of Odin, known in the Norse tradition as Yggdrasil. The name Irmin is also associated with the tribe of Irminones and older scholarship concludes that Irmin was the national god of the Saxons.

According to the Indiculus Superstitionum et Paganiarum, which outlines the forbidden pagan beliefs of the Saxons and neighboring tribes, holy sites included natural places (such as springs, trees, and rocks) and their magical practices included spells (galdr), amulets, fortune-telling, rituals for the dead, feasts in honor of the gods, and moon worship.

== History ==
While some Saxons migrated to Britain and adopted Christianity rather early due to Jutish influence, the continental Saxons remained pagan for centuries longer. During the late seventh and early eighth centuries, the first efforts of evangelizing the Saxons was done by Christian missionaries such Hewald the White and Hewald the Black, who were martyred by villagers. Throughout the eighth century, villagers and peasants resisted Christianization, causing turmoil within Saxon society as the nobles embraced the new religion.

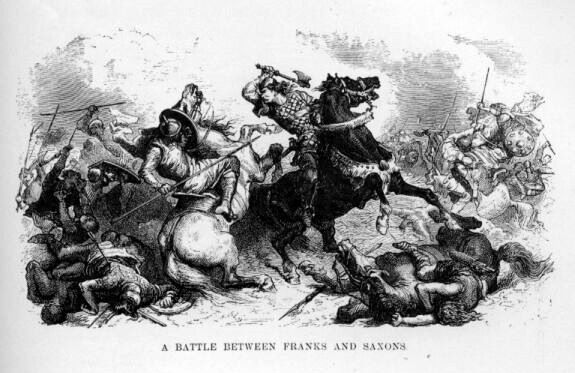
A Battle Between Franks and Saxons by Alphonse de Neuville, 1869

In order to integrate the Saxons into his Carolingian Empire, Charlemagne began forced baptisms and tithings, brewing animosity among the Saxon commoners. In 785, he issued the Capitulatio de partibus Saxoniae, which outlined punishment for tree worship and the death penalty to all Saxon who held pagan beliefs and resisted baptism:

"If any one of the race of the Saxons hereafter concealed among them shall have wished to hide himself unbaptized, and shall have scorned to come to baptism and shall have wished to remain a pagan, let him be punished by death."

The Frankish efforts escalated into all-out war against the Saxons, including the destructions of pagan holy places (primary example being Irminsul, replaced by a church in 783, blessed by Pope Leo III) and the killing of religious leaders. Alcuin of York lamented the cruel measures under Charlemagne, arguing:

"Faith is a free act of the will, not a forced act. We must appeal to the conscience, not compel it by violence. You can force people to be baptised, but you cannot force them to believe."

Charlemagne later abolished the death penalty for paganism and his successor son, Louis the Pious, took an altogether less violent approach. Now under the dominion of the Roman Catholic Church, the literati began writing poetic works glorifying Charlemagne's conquest as bringing salvation to the Saxons and rewriting the Gospels within the Saxon worldview, warrior culture, and virtues of heroism via the Heliand. Still, reports of pagan worship among the Saxons (particularly the worship of Freya) appear from the 9th-12th centuries, including 11th century reports that mention the continued worship within sacred groves by Saxons.

== See also ==
- Saxon Wars
- Anglo-Saxon paganism
- Germanic paganism
