= Seaxnēat =

National god of the Saxons

In Germanic mythology, Seaxnēat (pronounced [ˈsæɑksnæːɑt]) or Saxnôt was the national god of the Saxons. He is sometimes identified with either Tīwaz or Fraujaz (Old Norse Týr and Freyr).

== Attestations ==
The Old English form Seaxnēat is recorded in the genealogies of the kings of Essex (as Seaxnēt, Saxnēat, Saxnat). Originally he was the first ancestor listed, with the first king of Essex, Æscwine, seven generations later. A later version of the genealogy, preserved in the 12th-century Chronicon ex chronicis, makes Seaxnēat a son of Wōden (Odin).

The Old Saxon form Saxnôt is attested in the renunciation portion of the Old Saxon Baptismal Vow along with the gods Uuôden (Odin) and Thunaer (Thor).

== Etymology ==
The name is usually derived from seax, the eponymous long knife or short sword of the Saxons, and (ge)-not, (ge)-nēat as "companion" (cognate with German Genosse "comrade"), resulting in a translation of either "sword-companion" (gladii consors, ensifer) or "companion of the Saxons", which Jan de Vries further argued was the original name of the Saxons as a people. The suggestion that the second element means "need", cognate with the Anglo-Saxon verb nēotan, is less widely accepted.

== Analysis ==
Wōden is the divine progenitor in the other surviving Anglo-Saxon royal genealogies, so presumably the earlier form of the Essex genealogy preserves a specifically Saxon tradition of a national god. Wōden may have displaced national or regional deities in the other genealogies as part of his rising influence, or use of his name by churchmen.

Since the Old Saxon Baptismal Vow lists three gods, usually interpreted as a Germanic divine triad, Jacob Grimm argued that Saxnôt must have been a major deity, comparable in stature to UUoden and Thunaer. In 1828, he proposed that Saxnôt was another name for Freyr (Old Saxon Froho), whose sword is prominently mentioned in the Eddic poem Skírnismál. In Deutsche Mythologie, he later made the same argument in favour of identifying Saxnôt with Týr ("who else but Zio or Eor or the Greek Ares?"), who in Norse mythology has the sword as his characteristic weapon until he loses his right hand as a pledge in the binding of Fenrir. Seaxnēat/Saxnôt was also identified with Týr by Ernst Alfred Philippson and de Vries. As pointed out by Gabriel Turville-Petre, Georges Dumézil's trifunctional hypothesis would suggest he is Freyr (as a representative of the third "function" alongside Odin, representing the first, and Thor, representing the second); for this reason Rudolf Simek identified him with Freyr.

Through the alternative etymology of the second element of his name, deriving it from a root meaning 'to get, make use of', Seaxnēat/Saxnôt has also been related to the British deity Nodens and the Irish deity Nuada, by Rudolf Much and more recently by Swiss linguist Heinrich Wagner, who sees parallels in Nuada's role in Irish mythology as progenitor, and his possession of a flashing sword.

== See also ==
- List of Germanic deities
- West Germanic deities
