= Karl Koppmann =

German historian and archivist

Georg Friedrich Karl Koppmann (24 March 1839, Hamburg – 25 March 1905, Rostock) was a German historian, archivist and an authority in the field of German municipal history, particularly in the Hanseatic League.

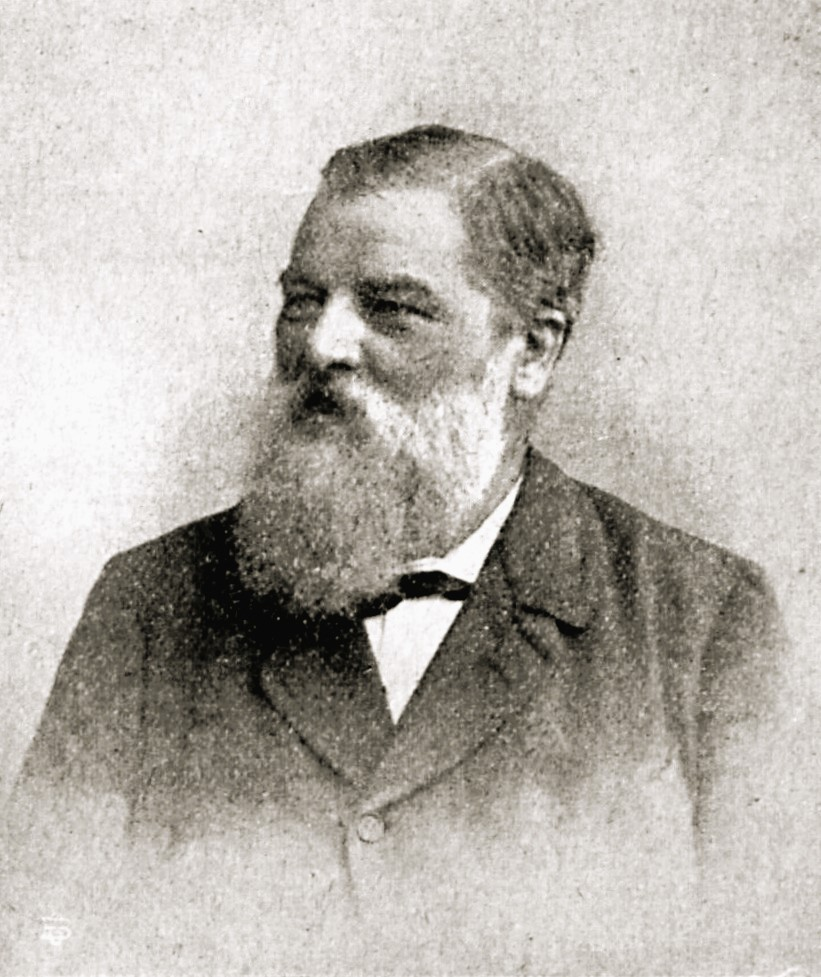
Karl Koppmann

Koppmann was the son of a butcher; he completed an apprenticeship as a watchmaker before teaching at a primary school.

In 1862 he began to study history at the Akademisches Gymnasium in Hamburg, followed by studies at the universities of Göttingen and Berlin. He completed his doctorate with a dissertation on the oldest documents of the Archdiocese of Hamburg-Bremen.

Koppmann then returned to Hamburg, working at the Hamburg State Archives and teaching at the Akademisches Gymnasium. During this time he published several articles on the history of Hamburg, including the Kämmereirechnungen der Stadt Hamburg. In 1870 he began to publish articles on the Hanseatic Empires for the Monumenta Germaniae Historica.

Koppmann was a member of the Verein für Hamburgische Geschichte from 1868, a board member from 1869 to 1872 and became its permanent secretary in 1874; during this time he also edited its journal.

== Publications ==
Koppmann's publications include;

- Beiträge zur Geschichte der Stadt Hamburg (1868)
- Necrologium capituli Hamburgensis (1868)
- Kämmereirechnungen der Stadt Hamburg, 1350-1562 (1869)
- Hamburgs kirchliche und Wohlthätigkeits - Anstalten im Mittelalter (1870)
- Hanserezesse 1256-1430 (1870)
- Das Seebuch (1876; Niederdeutsche Denkmäler 1)
- Der Verein für Hamburgische Geschichte nach seinen Aufgaben, Leistungen und Wünschen. Vortrag (1884)
- The chronicles of the cities of Lower Saxony: Lübeck (1884)
- Karl Ernst Hermann Krause. Biographische Skizze (1893)
- Geschichte der Stadt Rostock, Vol. 1
- Aus Hamburgs Vergangenheit, Vol. 1
- Hansische Geschichtsblätter

== See also ==
- Georg Adolph Emil Koppmann (1842-1909) Hamburg photographer
