= Old Saxon Baptismal Vow =

9th century Christian baptism vow

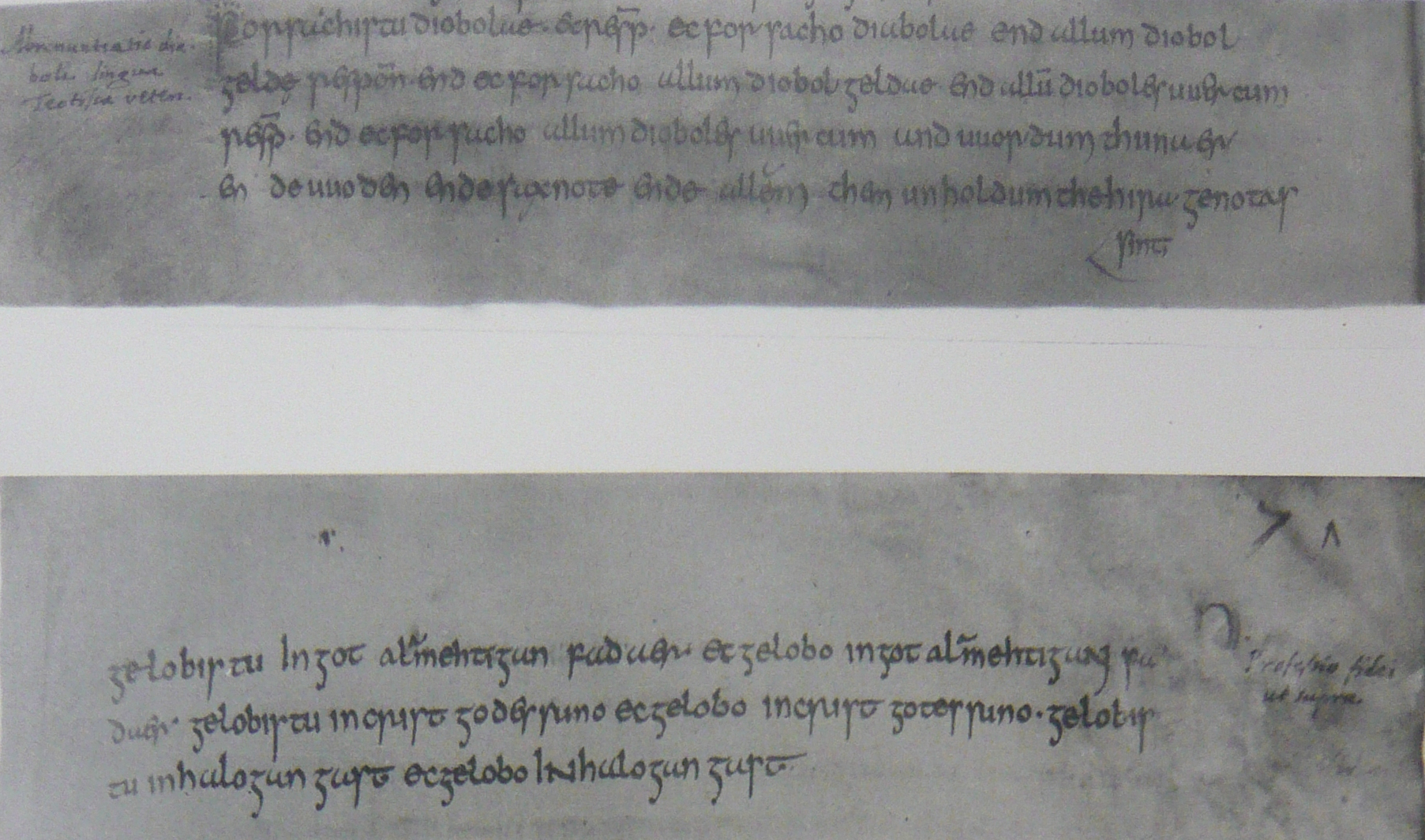
An 1895 facsimile of the baptismal vow.

The Old Saxon Baptismal Vow, also called the Old Saxon Catechism, Utrecht Baptismal Vow, and Abrenuntiatio Diaboli, is a baptismal vow that was found in a ninth-century manuscript in a monastery library in Mainz, Germany. The vow mentions three Germanic pagan gods of the Saxon pagans which the reader is to forsake: Uuôden ("Woden"), Thunaer and Saxnōt. Scholar Rudolf Simek comments that the vow is of particular interest because it is the sole instance of the god Saxnōt mentioned in a religious context. One of many baptismal vows, it is now archived in the Vatican Codex pal. 577.

Not withstanding the conventional name of the text, there is a dispute as to how the language of the text should be categorised, as it shows features of Old English, Old Low Franconian (Old Dutch), and Old Saxon (Old Low German).

== The Vow ==
The text (with Latin italicised) runs as follows:

1. Forsachistu diobolae?	1. Do you forsake the Devil?
& respondeat. ec forsacho diabolae.	and (s)he should reply: I forsake [the] devil.
2. end allum diobolgelde?	2. And all idolatry?
respondeat. end ec forsacho allum diobolgeldae.	(S)he should reply: And I forsake all idolatry.
3. end allum dioboles uuercum?	3. And all the devil's works?
respondeat. end ec forsacho allum dioboles uuercum and uuordum,	(S)he should reply: And I forsake all the Devil's works and promises,
Thunaer ende Uoden ende Saxnote ende allum them unholdum, the hira genotas sint.	Thunaer and Woden and Seaxnot and all those devils who are their followers.
4. gelobistu in got alamehtigan fadaer	4. Do you believe/trust in God the Almighty Father?
ec gelobo in got alamehtigan fadaer	I believe/trust in God the Almighty Father.
5. gelobistu in crist godes suno	5. Do you believe/trust in Christ, God's son?
ec gelobo in crist gotes suno.	I believe/trust in Christ, God's son.
6. Gelobistu in halogan gast.	6. Do you believe/trust in the Holy Ghost?
Ec gelobo in halogan gast.	I believe/trust in the Holy Ghost.

== Language dispute ==
While the manuscript of the vow is ninth-century, its language seems to be from the eighth. It is undoubtedly written in a mix of different West Germanic dialects, including features that could belong to Old High German, Old Low German (also known as Old Saxon), Old Frisian, Old Dutch (also known as Old Low Franconian), and Old English. This has led to extensive debate about where the text originated, not least because the text would stand as an important early monument to the language and traditions of whatever modern country can claim it — yet it is possible that none of these distinctions seemed very important to the people who copied and adapted the text. Key layers seem to be:

- Old English (probably specifically Northumbrian Old English). This would be consistent with production in Northumbria, or by a Northumbrian missionary active alongside Saint Boniface on the Continent.
- Old Low German or Old Dutch, which could be consistent with production at or transmission via a monastery at Utrecht (in the modern Netherlands).
- Old High German, which would be consistent with copying of the surviving manuscript by a speaker of this variety, perhaps at Hersfeld Abbey.

=== Comparison to present-day Dutch and Low German ===
In the glossary below, the spelling has been normalised:

- ⟨u⟩ is replaced with ⟨w⟩ when a consonant
- ⟨c⟩ is replaced with ⟨k⟩ and ⟨ch⟩ with ⟨kh⟩

Original word	Modern Dutch	Modern Low German	Modern English
end	en	un	and
e[k]	ik	ik	I
forsa[kh]o	verzaak	versak	forsake
allum	alle	all	all
dioboles	duivels	Düvels	devil's
[w]ercum	werken	Warken	works
and	en	un	and
[w]ordum	woorden	Woorden	words
Thunær	Donar	Donar	Thunor
ende	en	un	and
[W]ôden	Wodan	Wodan/Woden	Woden
ende	en	un	and
Saxnôte	Saxnot	Saxnot	Saxnot
ende	en	un	and
allum	allen	all	all
thêm	(van) deze	dissen	those
unholdum	ontrouwen	Unmannen	unfaithful
thê	die	de	who
hira	hun	ehr hör (East Frisian)	their
genôtas	(bond)genoten	Genoten	companions
sint	zijn	sünd	are

== Editions ==
Media related to Sächsisches Taufgelöbnis at Wikimedia Commons

- Capitularia Regum Francorum I, ed. by A. Boretius, Monumenta Germaniae Historica, Legum sectio 11 (Hanover, 1883), p. 22 (no. 107)
- 'Abrenuntiatio diaboli et prefessio fidei', ed. by E. Wadstein, Kleinere altsächsische Sprachdenkmäler, Niederdeutsche Denkmäler, 6 (Norden: Soltau, 1899), pp. 119–21
- Hodgkin, R. H., A History of the Anglo-Saxons, 3rd edn., 2 vols (Oxford, 1952), I, 302 [facsimile]

== See also ==
- Indiculus superstitionum et paganiarum, a Latin collection of capitularies identifying and condemning superstitious and pagan beliefs found in the north of Gaul and among the Saxons during the time of their subjugation and conversion by Charlemagne
- Seaxnēat
- Saxon paganism

== Sources ==
- Simek, Rudolf (1993), 'Saxon Baptismal Vow', in Dictionary of Northern Mythology, trans. by Angela Hall. D.S. Brewer. p. 276. ISBN 0-85991-513-1
