= Niederdeutsche Denkmäler =

Niederdeutsche Denkmäler (“Low German Monuments”) is a monographic publication series issued by the Association for Low German Linguistic Research (VndS). The series is dedicated to the editing and study of historical texts in the Low German language.

== History ==
It has been published in Neumünster by Wachholtz Verlag since 1876, and earlier also in Norden (Soltau) and in Bremen (Kühtmann). The first volume appeared in 1876, an edition of the manuscript of a “Seebuch” (rutter) in Middle Low German, whose origin is dated to the years 1472/73 (Part 1) and 1466/67 (Part 2). The second is collection of fables in Middle Low German, preserved in a (now lost) manuscript from the early 15th century, containing the so-called “Magdeburg Aesop”.

The series serves as an academic source documenting the linguistic and cultural development of Northern Germany.

== Overview ==
Published volumes are:

- 1. Koppmann, Karl; Breusing, Arthur (foreword): Das Seebuch (1876). Bremen: Küthmann, 1876 (digitized copy)
- 2. Gerhard von Minden; ed. Seelmann, Wilhelm; Gerhard von Minden (1878). Bremen: Verlag von J. Kühtmann's Buchhandlung, 1878 (digitized copy)
- 3. Waetzoldt, Stephan (ed.): Flos unde Blankflos (1880). Bremen: Kühtmann, 1880
- 4. Seelmann, Wilhelm (ed.): Valentin und Namelos: die niederdeutsche Dichtung, die hochdeutsche Prosa, die Bruchstücke der mittelniederländischen Dichtung nebst Einleitung, Bibliographie und Analyse des Romans Valentin & Orson (1884). Norden; Leipzig: Soltau, 1884
- 5. Schröder, Carl [introduction]: Redentiner Osterspiel: [annotiertes Exemplar] (1893). Norden; Leipzig: Diedr. Soltau's Verlag, 1893
- 6. Wadstein, Elis (ed.): Kleinere altsächsische Sprachdenkmäler: mit Anmerkungen und Glossar (1899). Norden; Leipzig: Soltau, 1899
- 7. Doneldey, Arnold; ed. Windler, Ernst: Das Bremer mittelniederdeutsche Arzneibuch des Arnoldus Doneldey (1932). Neumünster: Wachholtz, 1932
- 8. Konemann von Jerxheim; ed. Wolff, Ludwig: Die Dichtungen Könemanns: Kaland, Wurzgarten, Reimbibel (1953). Neumünster: Wachholtz, 1953
- 9. Stannat, Werner: Das Leben der heiligen Elisabeth in drei mittelniederdeutschen Handschriften aus Wolfenbüttel und Hannover (1959). Neumünster: Wachholtz, 1959
- 10. Wiepert, Peter (ed.): Volkserzählungen von der Insel Fehmarn (1964). Neumünster: Wachholtz, 1964
