= Continental Germanic mythology =

Central European folk legends up to the 8th century

Continental Germanic mythology formed an element within Germanic paganism as practiced in parts of Central Europe occupied by Germanic peoples up to and including the 6th to 8th centuries (the period of Germanic Christianization). Traces of some of the myths lived on in legends and in the Middle High German epics of the Middle Ages. Echoes of the stories, with the sacred elements largely removed, may appear throughout European folklore and in European fairy tales.

== Tribes ==
The mythologies of the following tribes are included in this category:

- Lombards (source: Paulus Diaconus)
- Alamanni (see: Nordendorf fibula, Pforzen buckle)
- Franks and Thuringii (see: Frankish mythology, Donar's Oak)
- Saxons (see: Saxon paganism, Irminsul)
- Frisii (source: Life of Saint Willibrord)
- Baiuvarii

== Paganism ==
Compared to North Germanic and, to a lesser extent, Anglo-Saxon mythology, examples of Continental Germanic paganism are extremely fragmentary. Besides a handful of brief Elder Futhark inscriptions the lone, genuinely pagan Continental Germanic documents are the short Old High German Merseburg Incantations. However, pagan mythological elements were preserved in later literature, notably in Middle High German epic poetry, but also in German, Swiss, and Dutch folklore.

== Texts ==
=== Middle Low German ===
- Ermenrichs Tod

=== Old High German ===
- Lay of Hildebrand
- Muspilli
- The Merseburg Incantations

=== Middle High German ===
- Nibelungenlied
- Kudrun
- Weyland
- Dietrich von Bern

== See also ==
- Mannaz
- Common Germanic deities
- Germanic king
- Anglo-Saxon polytheism
- Saxon paganism
- List of Germanic deities

== Sources ==
- Jacob Grimm: Deutsche Mythologie. 1835.
- Wolfgang Golther: Handbuch der Germanischen Mythologie. Stuttgart 1908.
- Jan de Vries: Altgermanische Religionsgeschichte. Berlin 1956.
- Åke V. Ström: Germanische Religion. Stuttgart 1975.
- M. Axboe; U. Clavadetscher; K. Düwel; K. Hauck; L. v. Padberg: Die Goldbrakteaten der Völkerwanderungszeit. Ikonographischer Katalog. München 1985-1989.
- Rudolf Simek: Lexikon der germanischen Mythologie. Stuttgart 2. Aufl. 1995. ISBN 3-520-36802-1
- Rudolf Simek: Religion und Mythologie der Germanen. Darmstadt 2003. ISBN 3-534-16910-7
