= Indiculus superstitionum et paganiarum =

Latin collection of capitularies

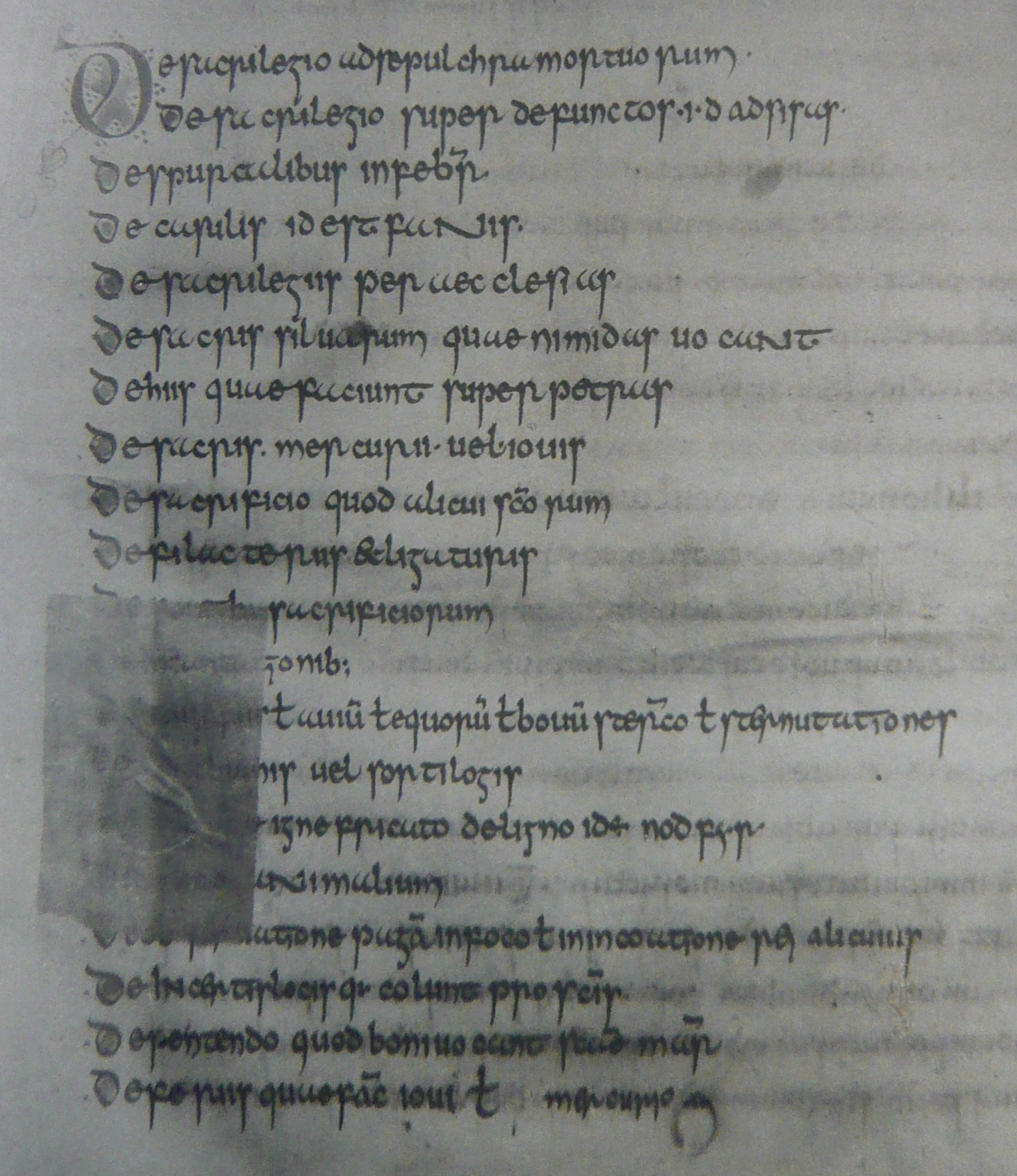
Facsimile reproduction of the first twenty chapter headings of the Indiculus.

The Indiculus superstitionum et paganiarum (Small index of superstitions and paganism) is a Latin collection of capitularies identifying and condemning superstitious and pagan beliefs found in the north of Gaul and among the Saxons during the time of their subjugation and conversion by Charlemagne.

From the original manuscript only the cover remains, which lists thirty chapters. The manuscript is held in the Vatican Library in a collection (Codex Palatinus Latinus 577) which probably originates from Fulda and thence traveled to Mainz, arriving there in 1479. From Mainz it went to the Bibliotheca Palatina in Heidelberg, and arrived in Rome at the latest in 1623. Preceding the Indiculus is the so-called Old Saxon Baptismal Vow. The text is edited in the Karlomanni Principis Capitulare, published by the Monumenta Germaniae Historica.

== Contents ==
This list is made up from heathen practices that were forbidden by the church. It is about venerating holy places in nature such as springs, trees and rocks. Also about magical practices as spells or magic words, amulets, fortune-telling, rituals for the dead, feast in honor of pagan gods and the worshipping of the moon.

Latin	English
De sacrilegio ad sepulchra mortuorum	About desecration at the graves of the dead
De sacrilegio super defunctos id est dadsisas	About desecration over the dead, i.e., funeral feasts
De spurcalibus in Februario	About obscene banquets in February
De casulis id est fanis	About small buildings, i.e., shrines
De sacrilegiis per aecclesias	About desecration of churches
De sacris siluarum quae nimidas vocant	About forest rites in sacred groves, called nimidas
De hiis quae faciunt super petras	About what is done upon stones
De sacris Mercurii, vel Iovis	About sacrifices to Mercury (Odin/Wodan) or Jupiter (Thor/Donar)
De sacrificio quod fit alicui sanctorum	About sacrifice to a saint
De filacteriis et ligaturis	About amulets and bindings
De fontibus sacrificiorum	About sacrifices at springs
De incantationibus	About incantations as Galdr
De auguriis vel avium vel equorum vel bovum stercora vel sternutationes	About omens from birds, horses, cattle dung, or sneezing
De divinis vel sortilogis	About divinations of destiny
De igne fricato de ligno id est nodfyr	About fire called nodfyr
De cerebro animalium	About using animal brains
De observatione pagana in foco, vel in inchoatione rei alicuius	About heathen observation/divination in the hearth or beginnings of a thing
De incertis locis que colunt pro sacris	About uncertain places venerated as sacred
De petendo quod boni vocant sanctae Mariae	About invoking what the good call Saint Mary
De feriis quae faciunt Jovi vel Mercurio	About festivals for Jupiter (Odin/Wodan) or Mercury (Thor/Donar)
De lunae defectione, quod dicunt Vinceluna	About the lunar eclips that they call Vinceluna
De tempestatibus et cornibus et cocleis	About using storms, bull horns, and snails
De sulcis circa villas	About incantations at furrows/doorpost around farmsteads/houses.
De pagano cursu quem yrias nominant, scissis pannis vel calciamentis	About the pagan race called Yria with torn clothes or shoes
De eo, quod sibi sanctos fingunt quoslibet mortuos	About pretending to call any dead person a saint for themselves
De simulacro de consparsa farina	About idols made of straw
De simulacris de pannis factis	About idols made from cloth
De simulacro quod per campos portant	About idols carried across fields
De ligneis pedibus vel manibus pagano ritu	About using wooden feet or hands in a pagan rite
De eo, quod credunt, quia femine lunam comendet, quod possint corda hominum tollere juxta paganos	About the belief that women bless the moon to affect hearts of the heathens with magic

== Date ==
Codex Palatinus Latinus 577 itself appears to have been copied ca. 800 in either Fulda or Mainz. Alain Dierkens argues, on the basis of word choice (the correspondence between the phrase superstitionem et paganiarum and the diction used by Boniface in his 742 letter to Pope Zachary) and a comparison between the content of the Indiculus and the conclusions of the Concilium Germanicum (744), that the Indiculus was indeed appended to or pertained to the decisions made at the Concilium Germanicum and the two consequent Frankish synods at Estinnes and Soissons. In other words, they were not the product of a late-seventh century scribe at Fulda, nor were the prohibitions aimed specifically or exclusively at the Saxons.

== Significance ==
The index provides valuable insight into the religious culture of the pagan Saxons (from the Christian point of view) and into the daily practices of Christian missionaries working in that area. Since it is more or less contemporary with the activities of Saint Boniface in modern-day Germany, he has been called a "guiding influence" on its compilation. According to Alain Dierkens, the Indiculus, which he thinks derives from the "entourage" of Boniface, evidences the ongoing practice of pre-Christian practices, including divination, the use of amulets, magic, and witchcraft, and suggests that the church allowed or transformed certain practices which it had been unable to extirpate.

== Editions ==
- "Forma Abrenuntiationis diaboli; Indiculus superstitionum et paganiarum". Georg Heinrich Pertz, Capitularia regum Francorum Vol. 1. MGH, 1835, 19–20.

== See also ==
- List of Frankish synods
- Saxon paganism
